= Chinese expedition to Tibet (1720) =

Military expedition into Tibet by the Qing dynasty against the Dzungar Khanate

Qing empire expedition to Tibet (1720)
- Part of Dzungar–Qing War
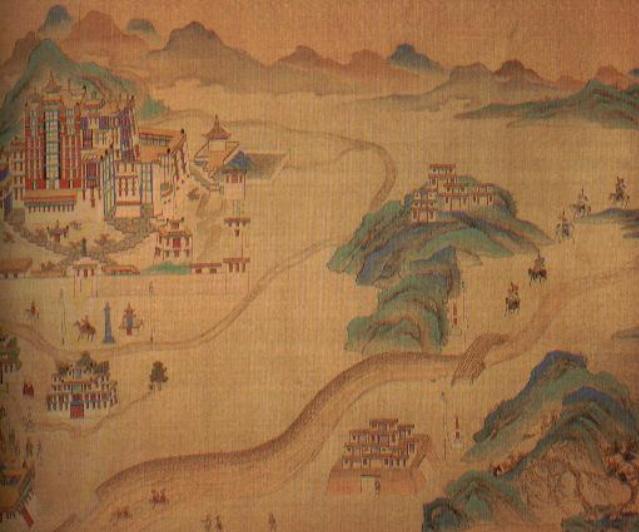
- "General of settle the distant" enter Lhasa during the expedition.
Date	1720
Location	Tibet, China
Result	Qing victory

Belligerents
Qing dynasty Polhanas (ally of Qing); Kangchennas (ally of Qing)	Dzungar Khanate

Commanders and leaders
Yinzheng, Kangxi's fourteenth son, commander-in-chief Kangxi Emperor; Yue Zhongqi (descendant of Yue Fei); Polhané Sönam Topgyé; Khangchenné	Tagtsepa

The 1720 Chinese expedition to Tibet (Chinese: 驅準保藏; lit. 'Expel the Dzungars to preserve Tibet') or the Chinese conquest of Tibet in 1720 was a military expedition sent by the Qing dynasty to expel the invading forces of the Dzungar Khanate from Tibet and establish Qing rule over the region, which lasted until the fall of the Qing dynasty in 1912.

== History ==
The Khoshut prince Güshi Khan overthrew the prince of Tsang and established the Khoshut Khanate on the Tibetan Plateau in 1642. As the main benefactor of the Gelug school of Tibetan Buddhism, he made the 5th Dalai Lama the highest spiritual and political authority in Tibet, who established the regime known as Ganden Phodrang in the same year. The Dzungar Khanate under Tsewang Rabtan invaded Tibet in 1717, deposed Ngawang Yeshey Gyatso, the pretender to the position of Dalai Lama of Lha-bzang Khan, who was the last ruler of the Khoshut Khanate, and killed Lhazang Khan and his entire family. They also destroyed a small force at the Battle of the Salween River, which the Kangxi Emperor of the Qing empire had sent to clear traditional trade routes in 1718. Just before his demise, Lha-bzang Khan requested protection from the Qing. In response, an expedition sent by the Kangxi Emperor, together with Tibetan forces under Polhanas of Tsang and Kangchennas (also spelled Gangchenney), the governor of Western Tibet, expelled the Dzungars from Tibet in 1720 as liberators of Tibet from the Dzungars. This Manchu-Han-Mongol joint expedition, escorting the recognized reincarnation of the Dalai Lama, attacked from two directions: one from Sichuan, which arrived in Lhasa first and captured the city, and one from the Kokonor (Qinghai) which largely consisted of the Khoshuts and reached the city with the new Dalai Lama on 24 September 1720. The Qing installed a new, more popular Dalai Lama, Kelzang Gyatso, as the 7th Dalai Lama and left behind a garrison of 3,000 men in Lhasa. In time, the Qing came to see themselves as overlords of Tibet and Tibet was turned into a protectorate by the Manchus. The Qing removed the indigenous civil government that had existed in Lhasa since the rule of the 5th Dalai Lama, and created a Tibetan cabinet or council of ministers known as the Kashag in 1721. This council was to govern Tibet under the close supervision of the Chinese garrison commander stationed in Lhasa, who frequently interfered with Kashag decisions, especially when Chinese interests were involved. Khangchenné would be the first ruling prince to lead the Kashag under Qing overlordship. This began the period of Qing administrative rule of Tibet, which lasted until the fall of the Qing empire in 1912.

At multiple places such as Lhasa, Batang, Dartsendo, Lhari, Chamdo, and Litang, Green Standard troops were garrisoned throughout the Dzungar war. Green Standard Army troops and Manchu Bannermen were both part of the Qing force who fought in Tibet in the war against the Dzungars. It was said that the Sichuan commander Yue Zhongqi (a descendant of Yue Fei) entered Lhasa first when the 2,000 Green Standard soldiers and 1,000 Manchu soldiers of the "Sichuan route" seized Lhasa. According to Mark C. Elliott, after 1728 the Qing used Green Standard Army troops to man the garrison in Lhasa rather than Bannermen. According to Evelyn S. Rawski both Green Standard Army and Bannermen made up the Qing garrison in Tibet. According to Sabine Dabringhaus, Green Standard Chinese soldiers numbering more than 1,300 were stationed by the Qing in Tibet to support the 3,000 strong Tibetan army.

== See also ==
- Tibet under Qing rule
- Qing dynasty in Inner Asia
- Dzungar–Qing War
- Mongol conquest of Tibet
- Battle of the Salween River
- Chinese expedition to Tibet (1910)
- British expedition to Tibet
