= Dzungar–Qing Wars =

Century-long conquest of the Dzungar Khanate

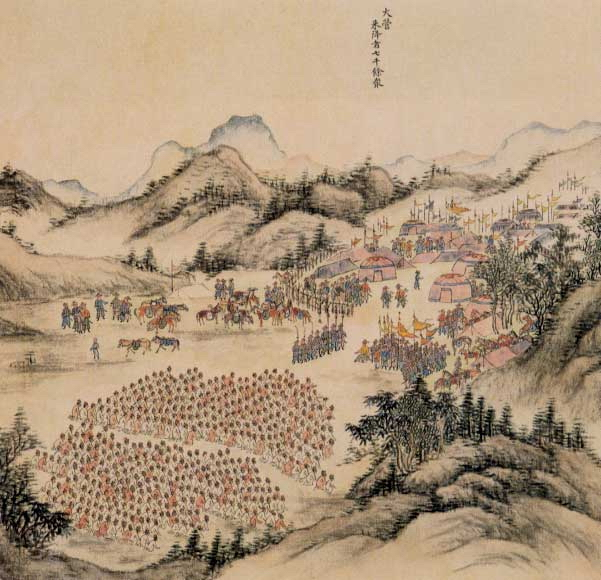
- The Dzungar army surrenders to the Qing dynasty after Dawachi is captured in 1756.
Date	1687–1758
Location	Inner and Outer Mongolia, Tibet, Qinghai, Xinjiang
Result	Qing victory: Destruction of the Dzungar Khanate; Start of the Dzungar genocide
Territorial changes	Outer Mongolia, Tibet, Qinghai and Xinjiang conquered and added into the Qing Empire

Belligerents
Dzungar Khanate	Qing dynasty: Khalkha Mongols; Kumul Khanate; Khoshut Khanate

Commanders and leaders
Galdan Boshugtu Khan; Tsewang Rabtan; Galdan Tseren; Queen Anu †; Amursana	Kangxi Emperor; Sun Ssu-k'o; Tüsheet Khan Chakhundorji; Abdullah Beg (額貝都拉); Yongzheng Emperor; Yue Zhongqi; Tsering; Nian Gengyao; Qianlong Emperor; Ming Rui; Agui; Emin Khoja

The Dzungar–Qing Wars (Mongolian: Зүүнгар-Чин улсын дайн, simplified Chinese: 准噶尔之役; traditional Chinese: 準噶爾之役; pinyin: Zhǔngá'ěr zhī Yì; lit. 'Dzungar Campaign'), also known as the Sino-Dzungar Wars, were a decades-long series of conflicts that pitted the Dzungar Khanate against the Qing dynasty and its Mongol vassals. Fighting took place over a wide swath of Inner Asia, from present-day central and eastern Mongolia to Tibet, Qinghai, and Xinjiang regions of present-day China. Qing victories ultimately led to the incorporation of Outer Mongolia, Tibet and Xinjiang into the Qing Empire that was to last until the fall of the dynasty in 1911–1912, and the genocide of much of the Dzungar population in the conquered areas.

== Background ==
After the collapse of the Yuan dynasty in 1368, China's Mongol rulers withdrew to Mongolia and became known as the Northern Yuan. Over time, the Mongol state disintegrated into a series of Khanates, ruled by various descendants of Genghis Khan. The Qing dynasty defeated the Inner Chahar Mongol leader Ligdan Khan and annexed Inner Mongolia. While the Eastern Mongols (Outer and Inner Mongols) were ruled by Chingisids, the Oirats were ruled by the Choros clan. The Dzungar Oirats under Erdeni Batur and Zaya Pandita held a pan-Oirat-Mongol conference in 1640 with all Oirat and Mongol tribes participating except the Inner Mongols under Qing rule. The conference ended in failure. By the 1650s, the Dzungar Khanate, an Oirat state centered in Dzungaria and western Mongolia, had risen to become the preeminent khanate in the region and was often in conflict with Khalkha Mongols, the remnants of the Northern Yuan, of eastern Mongolia. Upon assuming the throne after the death of his brother Sengge in 1670, Galdan Boshugtu Khan launched a series of successful campaigns to expand his territory as far as present-day eastern Kazakhstan, and from present-day northern Kyrgyzstan to southern Siberia. Through skillful diplomacy, Galdan maintained peaceful relations with the Qing dynasty while also establishing relations with Russia. However, when Galdan's brother Dorjijab was killed in a skirmish with troops loyal to the Khalkha khan in 1687, Galdan took the pretext to launch a full-scale invasion of eastern Mongolia. He destroyed several Khalkha tribes at the battle of Olgoi Nor (Olgoi Lake) in 1688, sending twenty thousand refugees fleeing south to Qing territory.

The Khalkha rulers, defeated, fled to Hohhot and sought Qing assistance. Meanwhile, the Qing had secured a peace treaty with the Cossacks on their northern border, who had previously been inclined to support Galdan. The Treaty of Nerchinsk prevented an alliance between Galdan and the Russians, leaving the Qing free to attack their Mongol rivals. Fearing a united Mongol state ruled by the hostile Dzungars, the Qing now turned their powerful war machine on the Oirats.

The Dzungars had conquered and subjugated the Uyghurs during the Dzungar conquest of Altishahr after being invited by the Afaqi Khoja to invade the Chingisid Chagatai ruled Yarkent Khanate. Heavy taxes were imposed upon the Uyghurs by the Dzungars, provoking resentment. This led to uprisings and Uyghur rebels from Turfan and Kumul who were rebelling against Dzungar rule joined the Qing in their war against the Dzungars. The Yarkent Khanate under Muhammad Amin Khan presented tribute to the Qing dynasty twice to request aid against the Dzungar attack.

The Dzungars used the Zamburak, camel mounted miniature cannons, in battle, notably at Ulan Butung. Gunpowder weapons like guns and cannons were deployed by the Qing and the Dzungars at the same time against each other.

== First Dzungar-Qing War ==
First Dzungar – Qing War
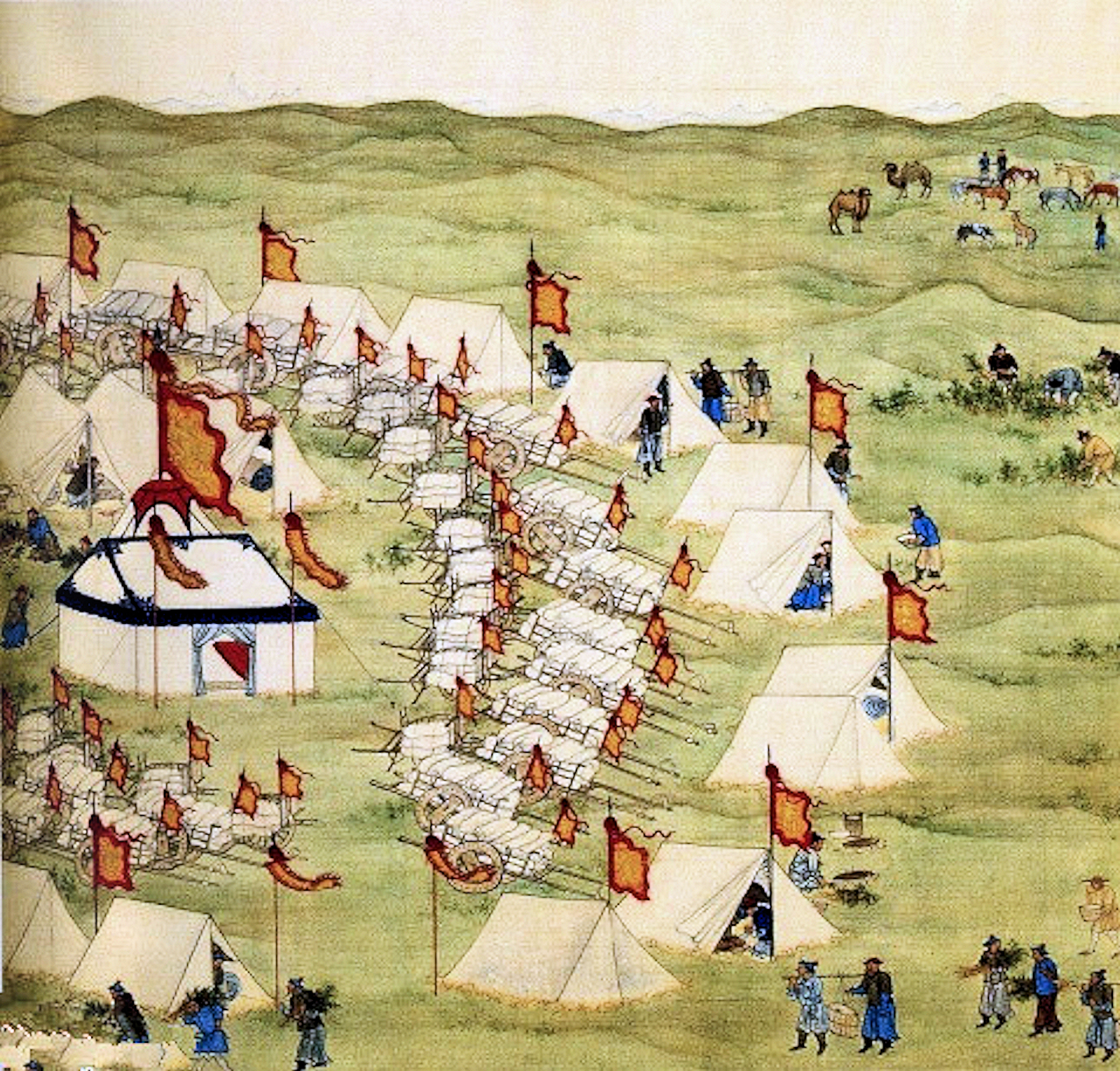
- Military camp of the Chinese Emperor at Kherlen River during the campaign of 1696
Date	1687–1697
Location	Mongolia
Result	Qing victory • Dzungar Khanate weakened

Belligerents
Dzungar Khanate	Qing dynasty: Remnants of the Northern Yuan (Vassal of the Qing); Kumul Khanate (Vassal of the Qing)

Commanders and leaders
(Dzungar Khanate) Galdan Boshugtu Khan ‡‡ (Dzungar Khanate) Queen Anu †	(Qing dynasty) Kangxi Emperor; Chakhundorji; Abdullah Beg

Strength
20,000–30,000	100,000

Casualties and losses
Unknown	Unknown

The First Dzungar–Qing War was a military conflict fought from 1687 to 1697 between the Dzungar Khanate and an alliance of the Qing dynasty and the northern Khalkhas, remnants of the Northern Yuan dynasty. The war resulted from a Dzungar attack on the Northern Yuan dynasty based in Outer Mongolia, who were heavily defeated in 1688. Their rulers and twenty thousand refugees fled south to the Qing dynasty, which feared the growing power of the Dzungar state. Motivated by the opportunity to gain control over Mongolia and by the threat posed to them by a strong, unified Mongol state such as the Oirats threatened to form, the Qing sent their army north to subdue the Dzungars in 1690.

Qing scouts attacked a Dzungar party north of the Great Wall. However, this proved to be the main Dzungar army, which destroyed the Qing detachment easily. A large Qing army under Prince Fuquan advanced North into Inner Mongolia, hoping to trap and crush the mobile Dzungar army. However, they were constrained by bad weather and difficult terrain. It took some Qing troops twelve days to cross the Gobi Desert, and the horses were left exhausted. Running low on supplies, the Qing finally confronted the Dzungars at Ulan Butung in September 1690. Although outnumbered 5 to 1, the Dzungars formed a camel wall, beat back a pair of artillery-supported Qing assaults, and escaped into the hills. The Qing commander claimed victory, but his failure to completely destroy the Dzungar forces led to his dismissal and early retirement. Galdan was left in control of Mongolia from the Selenga River in the north to Khalkhyn Gol in the south.

A pause in the conflict ensued. The Khalkha rulers declared themselves Qing vassals at Dolon Nor (the site of Shangdu, the pleasure palace of the Yuan Emperors) in 1691, a politically decisive step that officially ended the last remnants of the Yuan dynasty. It also allowed the Qing to assume the mantle of the Genghisid khans, merging the Khalkha forces into the Qing army. The Kangxi Emperor had now become determined to "exterminate" Galdan. Negotiations between the two sides bore little fruit. The Dzungars cast about for allies, making overtures to the Russians and various Mongol princes, but were rejected. Kangxi set about preparing the complex logistics necessary to support a planned 1696 expedition. This included procuring 1,333 carts, each carrying 6 shi of grain. Three armies eventually advanced north in 1696. One, under the command of Fiyanggu, numbering 30,000 and to be reinforced with a further 10,000, was to trap Galdan, while Kangxi personally led 32,000 men, including 235 cannon on camelback. A third, numbering 10,000, halted further to the east and would play no part in the coming campaign. The Dzungar army, heavily outnumbered and weakened by the plague, was unable to offer serious resistance. Galdan's army attacked the western force at the Battle of Jao Modo in May 1696, but was narrowly – albeit decisively- defeated. The Dzungar army, bereft of artillery, suffered heavily from Chinese musketry and cannon fire, eventually breaking. The battle ended in a victory for the Qing army, who captured 20,000 sheep and 40,000 cattle, and captured, killed or scattered all but 40–50 of the Dzungar army, effectively destroying them as a military force. Galdan himself had managed to escape from an enemy encirclement, thanks in part to a counterattack led by his wife, Queen Anu. Galdan's wife, Queen Anu, died in the Battle of Jao Mudo. The circumstances surrounding the death of Galdan Boshugtu Khan continue to be debated in the literature by historians. As indicated by Vladimir Moiseev using Mongolian accounts referenced in the works of D. Gongor, Galdan took his own life after being defeated for the last time in 1697 in order to avoid being captured by the armies of the Qing Dynasty. (Note: As an Oirat prince, D. Gongor has argued Galdan would have preferred death rather than captivity and subsequent shame. Please see)

In contrast, Western and Chinese interpretations of this event are offered by Peter C. Perdue, who offers evidence suggesting Galdan died from disease or possibly the plague in the mountains of the Altai range with no more than several loyal followers.

After the war, a Qing garrison was stationed in the area of present-day Ulaanbaatar, and Khalkha Mongolia was placed under Qing rule. Outer Mongolia was effectively incorporated into the Qing Empire. On the other hand, Tsewang Rabtan, a long-time anti-Galdan Oirat chief, who had actually provided intelligence to the Qing at several points during the war, succeeded Galdan as Khan of the Dzungars. While the Qing managed to sideline the Dzungar in the 1690s, they would not completely eradicate them until they defeated the Dzungars in subsequent wars several decades later.

== Second Dzungar-Qing War, in Tibet ==
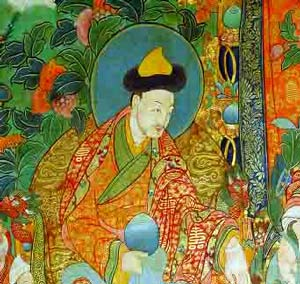
7th Dalai Lama pretender, Lha-bzang Khan

In 1642, Güshi Khan, founder of the Khoshut Khanate, overthrew the prince of Tsang and made the 5th Dalai Lama the highest spiritual and political authority in Tibet, establishing the regime known as Ganden Phodrang. Tsewang Rabtan of the Dzungar Khanate invaded Tibet in 1717, deposed the pretender to the position of 7th Dalai Lama, Lha-bzang Khan, the last ruler of the Khoshut Khanate, and killed Lha-bzang Khan and his entire family. They also viciously destroyed a small force in the Battle of the Salween River which the Kangxi Emperor of the Qing dynasty had sent to clear traditional trade routes in 1718. In response, an expedition sent by Kangxi Emperor, together with Tibetan forces under Polhané Sönam Topgyé of Tsang and Kangchennas (also spelled Gangchenney), the governor of Western Tibet, expelled the Dzungars from Tibet in 1720. This began the Qing rule of Tibet, which lasted until the fall of the Qing dynasty in 1912. The Han Chinese General Yue Zhongqi (a descendant of Yue Fei) conquered Tibet for the Qing during the Dzungar–Qing War. Jalangga, a Manchu Bannermen, succeeded the Han General Yue Zhongqi as commander in 1732.

The Manchu Kangxi emperor incited anti-Muslim sentiment among the Mongols of Qinghai (Kokonor) in order to gain support against the Dzungar Oirat Mongol leader Galdan. Kangxi claimed that Chinese Muslims inside China such as Turkic Muslims in Qinghai (Kokonor) were plotting with Galdan, who he falsely claimed converted to Islam. Kangxi falsely claimed that Galdan had spurned and turned his back on Buddhism and the Dalai Lama and that he was plotting to install a Muslim as ruler of China after invading it in a conspiracy with Chinese Muslims. Kangxi also distrusted Muslims of Turfan and Hami.

== Third Dzungar–Qing War ==
In 1723, the Kangxi Emperor's successor, the Yongzheng Emperor, sent an army of 230,000 led by Nian Gengyao to quell a Dzungar uprising in Qinghai on the Qinghai-Tibet plateau. Due to geography, the Qing army (although superior in numbers) was at first unable to engage their more mobile enemy. Eventually, they met the Dzungars and defeated them. This campaign cost the treasury at least eight million silver taels. Later in Yongzheng's reign, he sent a small army of 10,000 under Furdan to fight the Dzungars again. However, that army was ambushed and annihilated near the Khoton Lake in 1731 and the Qing Empire once again faced the danger of losing control of Mongolia. Another force under Yue Zhongqi successfully raided the Oirats in Ürümqi in 1731, but was forced to withdraw, lacking sufficient troops to defend their position. A Khalkha ally of the Qing Empire would finally defeat the Dzungars a year later in 1732 near the Erdene Zuu Monastery in Mongolia. The Qing then made peace with the Dzungar Khanate and decided the border between them in a 1739 treaty.

== Final conquest of the Dzungars ==
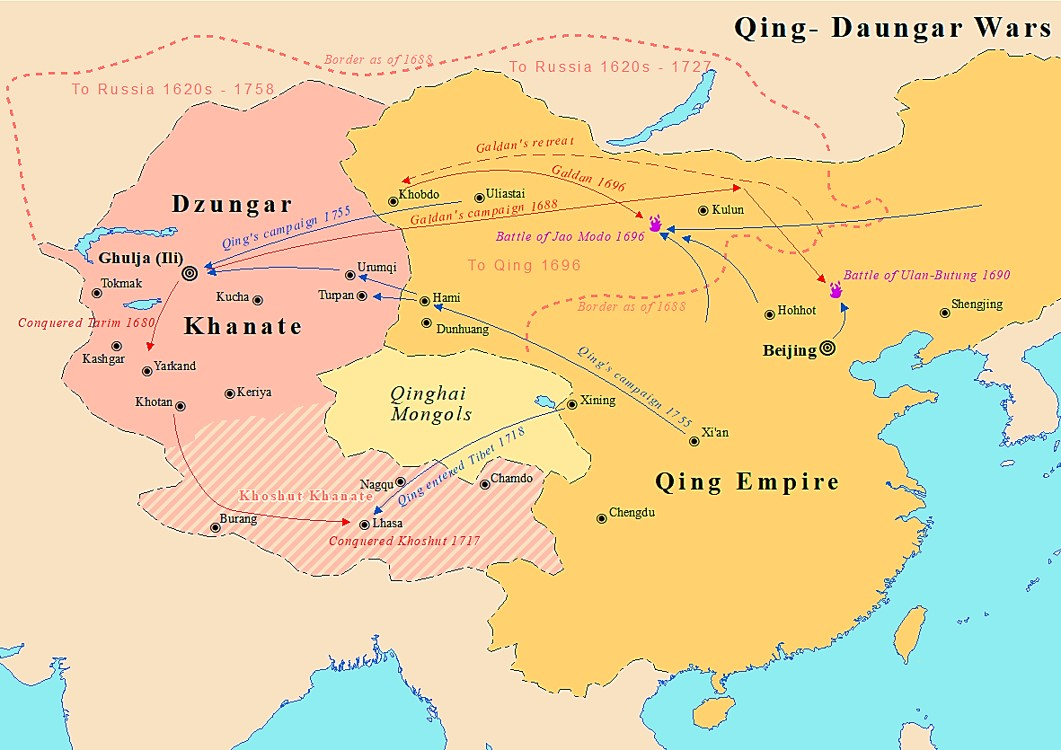
Map showing wars between the Qing dynasty and Dzungar Khanate

In 1752, Dawachi and the Khoit-Oirat prince Amursana competed for the title of Khan of the Dzungars. Amursana suffered several defeats at the hands of Dawachi and was thus forced to flee with his small army to the protection of the Qing imperial court. The Yongzheng Emperor's successor, the Qianlong Emperor, pledged his support to Amursana, who recognized Qing authority; among those who supported Amursana and the Chinese were the Khoja brothers Burhān al-Dīn and Khwāja-i Jahān. In 1755, Qianlong sent the Manchu general Zhaohui, who was aided by Amursana, Burhān al-Dīn and Khwāja-i Jahān, to lead a campaign against the Dzungars. After several skirmishes and small scale battles along the Ili River, the Qing army, led by Zhaohui, approached Ili (Gulja) and forced Dawachi to surrender. Qianlong appointed Amursana as the Khan of Khoid and one of four equal khans – much to the displeasure of Amursana, who wanted to be the Khan of the Dzungars.

Amursana now rallied the majority of the remaining Oirats to rebel against Qing authority. In 1758, General Zhaohui defeated the Dzungars in two battles: the Battle of Oroi-Jalatu and the Battle of Khurungui. In the first battle, Zhaohui attacked Amursana's camp at night; Amursana was able to fight on until Zhaohui received enough reinforcements to drive him away. Between the battles of Oroi-Jalatu and Khurungui, the Chinese under Prince Cabdan-jab defeated Amursana at the Battle of Khorgos (known in the Qianlong engravings as the "Victory of Khorgos"). At Mount Khurungui, Zhaohui defeated Amursana in a night attack on his camp after crossing a river and drove him back. To commemorate Zhaohui's two victories, Qianlong had the Puning Temple of Chengde constructed, home to the world's tallest wooden sculpture of the bodhisattva Avalokiteśvara and hence its alternate name, the 'Big Buddha Temple'. Afterwards, Khojis of Us-Turfan submitted to the Qing Empire. After all of these battles, Amursana fled to Russia (where he died) while Chingünjav fled north to Darkhad but was captured at Wang Tolgoi and executed in Beijing.

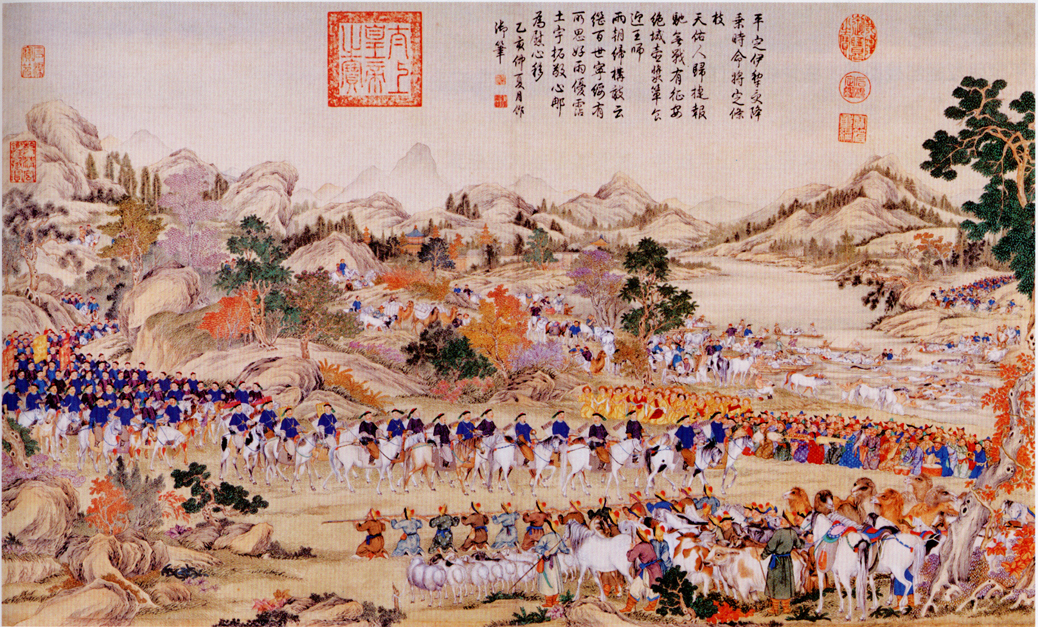
Zhaohui receives the surrender of Dawachi at Ili, 1755. Painting by Jesuit painter at the Qing court, Ignatius Sichelbart.

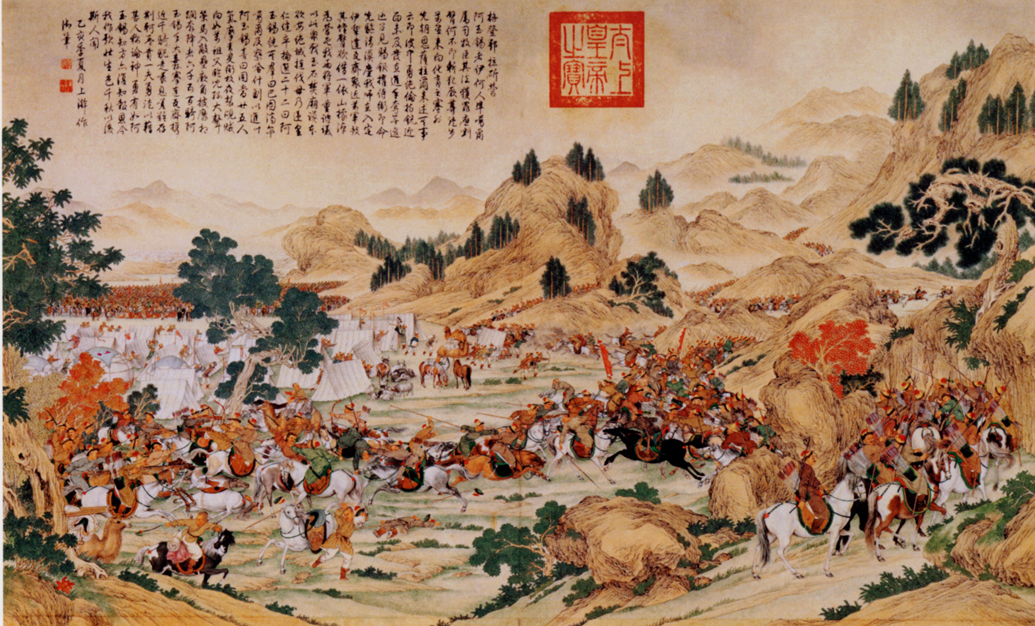
"Storming of the Camp at Gädän-Ola", a scroll depicting a raid in 1755 in which the Kalmuk Ayusi, having gone to the Chinese side, attacks Dawa achi's camp on Mount Gadan. Painting by Giuseppe Castiglione.

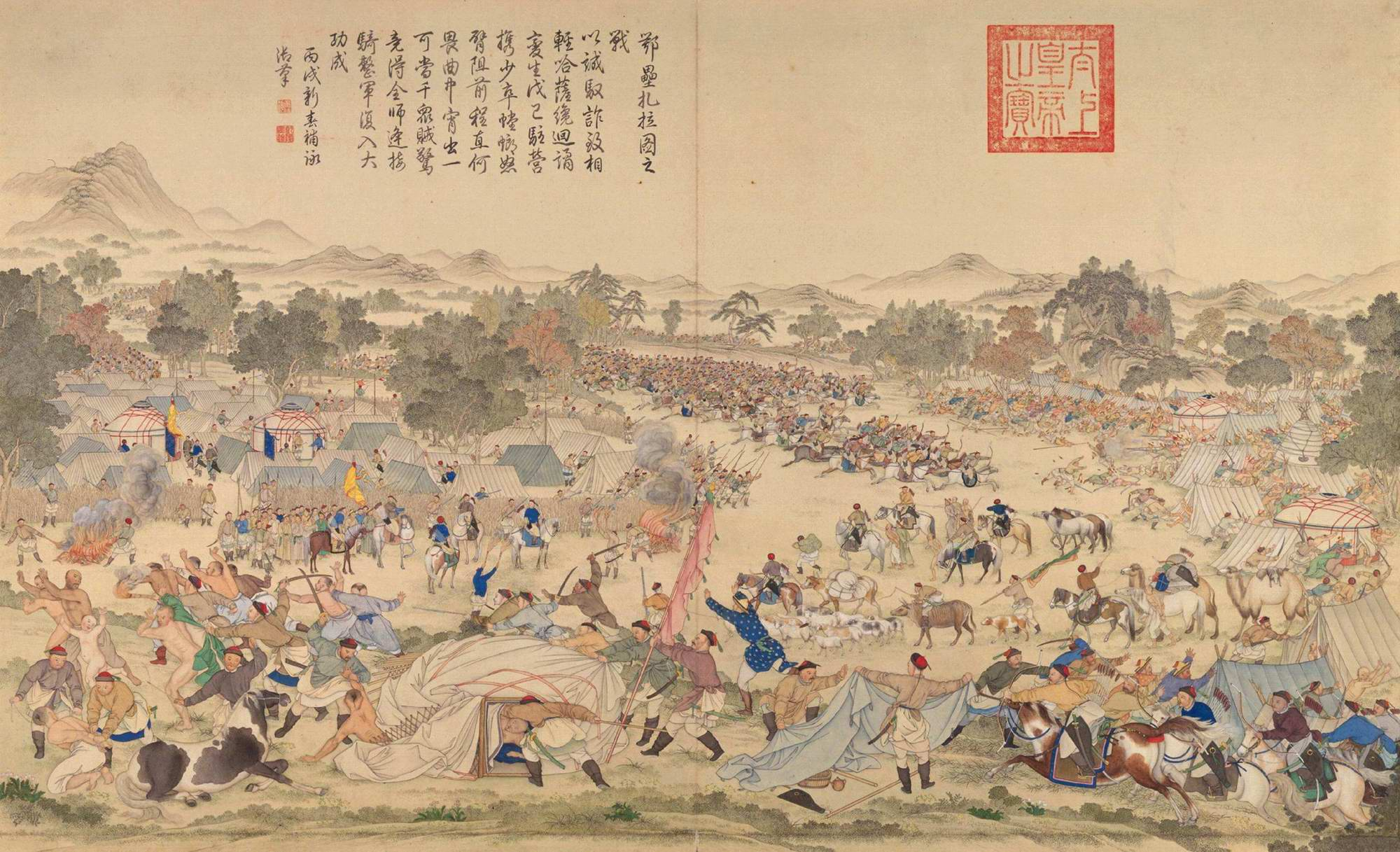
The Battle of Oroi-Jalatu, 1756. Chinese general Zhao Hui attacked the Zunghars at night in present Wusu, Xinjiang. Painting by Giuseppe Castiglione.

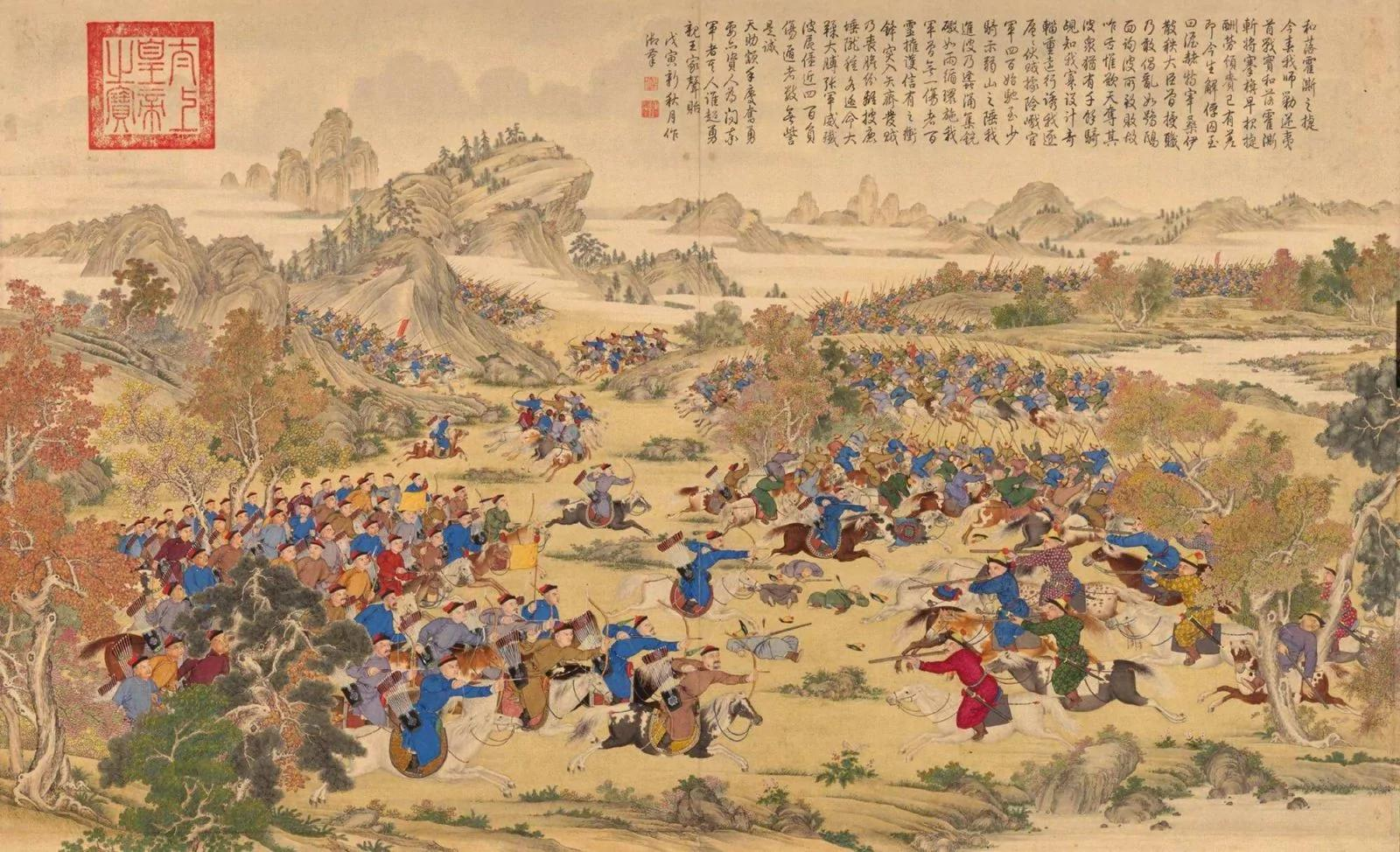
"The Victory of Khorgos". The partisans of Amursana were defeated in 1758 by Prince Cäbdan-jab. Painting by Jean Denis Attiret.

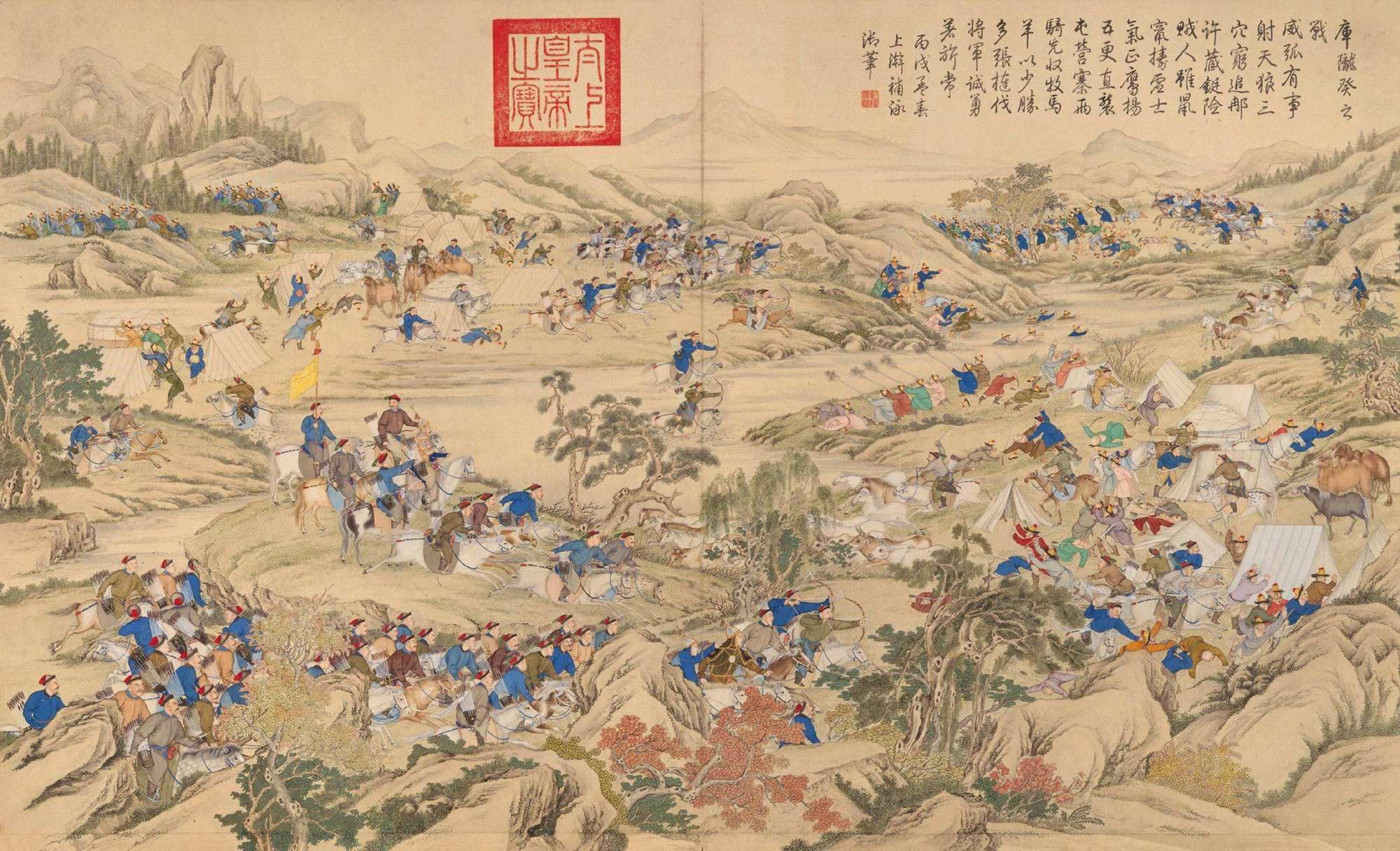
Battle of Khurungui, 1758. General Zhao Hui ambushes and defeats the Zungarian forces of Amoursana on Mount Khurungui (near Almaty, Kazakhstan). Painted by Jean-Damascène Sallusti.

== See also ==
- Dzungar genocide
- Ten Great Campaigns
- Galdan Boshugtu Khan
- Qing dynasty in Inner Asia
  - Mongolia under Qing rule
  - Tibet under Qing rule
  - Xinjiang under Qing rule
