= Khangchenné =

- Prince Xizang of the Second Rank
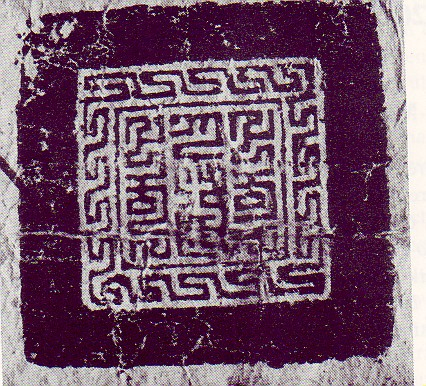
- 1725 Official Seal of Khangchenné

Prince Xizang of the Second Rank
- Reign: 1721 – 1727
- Predecessor: new title
- Successor: Polhané Sönam Topgyé

Kalön of Tibet
- In office: 1721 – 1727; Serving with Ngabo Dorje Gyalpo, Lumpanas Tashi Gyalpo, Jaranas Lodrö Gyalpo, and Polhané Sönam Topgyé
- Monarch: 7th Dalai Lama
- Died: August 5, 1727; Lhasa
Names
- Tibetan name: Khangchenné Sonam Gyalpo (ཁང་ཆེན་ནས་བསོད་ནམས་རྒྱལ་པོ); Mongolian name: Daicing Batur (Дайчин баатар)
Regnal name
- Prince Xizang of the Second Rank (西藏郡王)

Khangchenné Sonam Gyalpo (Tibetan: ཁང་ཆེན་ནས་བསོད་ནམས་རྒྱལ་པོ, Wylie: khang-chen-nas bsod-nams rgyal-po, Lhasa dialect: [kʰɑ́ŋt͡ɕẽ́nɛ᷈ː sǿnɑ᷈m cɛ̀ːpó]; Chinese: 康濟鼐) (died 5 August 1727) was the first important representative of the noble house Gashi (Tibetan: དག་བཞི, Wylie: dga-bzhi) in Tibet. Between 1721 and 1727 he led the Tibetan cabinet (Kashag, Wylie: bka'-shag) that governed the country during the period of Qing rule of Tibet. He was eventually murdered by his peers in the cabinet, which triggered a bloody but brief civil war. The nobleman Polhané Sönam Topgyé came out as the victor and became the new ruling prince of Tibet under the Chinese protectorate.

== Rise to power ==
Khangchenné (the one from Khangchen), often known by the title Dai-ching Batur in Tibetan sources, did not stem from any of the older noble houses of Tibet. He was able to make a career thanks to the Khoshut protector-king Lhabzang Khan who appointed him governor of West Tibet (Ngari) in 1715. Simultaneously he was the chief minister of the ruler. It is possible that he reached this position since he was married to a daughter of Lhabzang Khan. The Dzungar people unexpectedly invaded Tibet from the north-west in 1717 as a part of their strategy to dominate Inner Asia and to keep the Qing dynasty out. Khangchenné was the first to warn Lhabzang Khan for the impending danger. However, he was not able to assist the king in the defensive struggle from his distant base in West Tibet. Lhabzang Khan was killed in action in Lhasa in November and the Dzungar took over Tibet and led a harsh regime. As a marionett ruler they appointed the nobleman Tagtsepa.

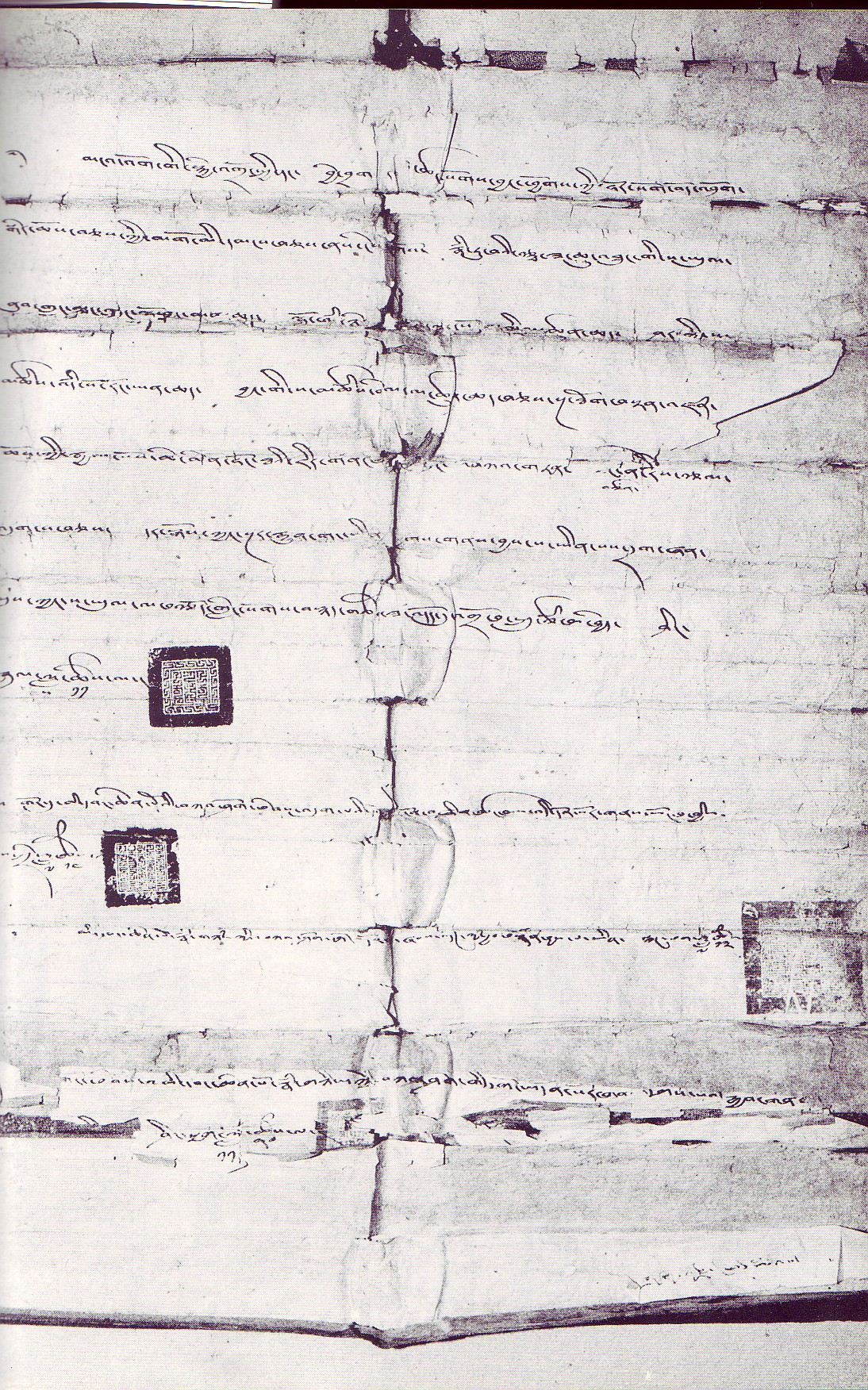
1725 Tibetan Legal Document of Khnagchene bSod-nams rgyal-po

After the Dzungar conquest, Khangchenné stayed in Ngari and began to interrupt the lines of communication between the Dzungars stationed in Tibet and their home base in Dzungaria. In 1719 he successfully attacked a troop of mounted Dzungar warriors who were about to bring some of Lhabzang Khan's old officers to Dzungaria. Together with the nobleman Pholhané he organized military resistance against the Dzungar. After almost three years, the unpopular Dzungar rule came to an end through a 1720 expedition launched by the Qing Kangxi Emperor. The puppet regent Tagtsepa was executed, the 7th Dalai Lama was brought to Lhasa, and a provisional government was formed by the occupants. Thanks to his great services against the Dzungars, Khangchenné was appointed head of a Tibetan cabinet or Kashag in 1721 on the orders of Kangxi. He thereby kept his own basis of power in Ngari. The old office of desi (regent) was abolished as it gathered too much power in one hand. Instead Khangchenné received the titles Dai-ching Batur and chairman of the cabinet. He was granted the Yardrokling estate for his personal support.

== Leader of the cabinet ==
The new Tibetan government had to cope with several difficulties from the beginning. Apart from an enormous inflation, there was a problem of providing for the 3,000 men in the Chinese garrison. As a consequence the Tibetan population was burdened with a substantial tax increase. This problem was solved in 1723 when the Qing troops withdrew, leaving the administration entirely in Tibetan hands without any military support. At the same time, however, a rebellion took place in Kokonor in present-day Qinghai. A Khoshut prince called Chingwang Lozang Tenzin rebelled against the imperial government. After the revolt had been suppressed, Kokonor (Qinghai) was integrated into the Qing Empire in early 1724 and thus separated from Central Tibet.

It was also problematic for the running of government affairs that Khangchenné was often absent from Lhasa. He preferred to stay in Ngari. In 1723 he interfered successfully in a war in Nepal between the kingdoms of Mustang and Jumla. He dispatched 100 Mongolian horsemen to southern Mustang in order to besiege the fortress Kagbeni together with troops from Mustang and Ladakh. In 1725 the Yongzheng Emperor ordered him to reside permanently in Lhasa. The jurisdiction over Ngari was entrusted Khangchenné's elder brother Gashipa Tseten Tashi.

== Hostility between the ministers ==
Khangchenné possessed great competence but was perceived as arrogant and ill-suited to cooperate with the others in the Kashag. His impopularity further increased due to an edict issued by Yongzheng which stipulated the persecution of the Nyingma school of Tibetan Buddhism, which the Dalai Lama considered heretic. All the other members of the Kashag including Pholhané were against the implementation of the edict. Nevertheless Khangchenné tried to follow the emperor's will. As a consequence his standing among the Tibetan population shrank more and more.

From the very beginning, the Kashag was split into two hostile camps. On one side stood Khangchenné and Pholhané, both representatives of a new layer of nobles and adherents of the Chinese emperor. Both had their main bases in West Tibet and Tsang (West Central Tibet). The other side, supported by the father of the Seventh Dalai Lama, consisted of Ngaphöpa Dorje Gyalpo, Lumpané Tashi Gyalpo and Jarané who represented the old Tibetan nobility and had vested interests in Ü. From a regional point of view they represented the nobles of Central and South Tibet.

== The murder of Khangchenné and its consequences ==
The open hostility between the two parties impeded a smooth government from the start. Finally the representatives of the old nobility decided to eliminate Khangchenné and Pholhané. The assault was obviously planned during a long time. Pholhané had left Lhasa since his wife was seriously ill and stayed at their residence in Pholha. There he received a letter from the teacher of the Seventh Dalai Lama that warned him of staying in Lhasa in July–August 1727. He should also take care that his eldest son did not stay in Lhasa in this period. Pholhane immediately sent a word of warning to Khangchenné via friends, but he did not take much notice of it. The conspirators heard that the Yongzheng Emperor had sent two envoys to Khangcenné to offer praise and resolved to strike quickly before they had arrived.

On 5 August 1727 a routine meeting of the Kashag took place in an upper room of the Jokhang temple. Khangchenné took part of it in a good mood, joking and fraternizing. A letter was handed to him by a subordinate official. As Khangchenné began to read, he was unexpectedly seized from behind by some officials. All the present ministers now drew their daggers and stabbed Khangchenné to death. His guards, who waited outside the office, were killed as well, while all present followers of the murdered minister were apprehended and taken away. On the next day the murderers sent people to arrest and kill Khangchenné's wife and her sister, together with his secretary and a steward. The conspirators dispatched a troop to Pholha with orders to eliminate Pholhané. The latter, however, had arranged for his escape to West Tibet, and the troop had to turn back without carrying out the deed. The consequence was a civil war that raged for a year, where Pholhané eventually triumphed.

The noble house Gashi, more known under the name Doring (Tibetan: རྡོ་རིང, Wylie: rdo-ring), survived this assault on its main representative. His relatives served the various Tibetan governments until the 1950s.

== See also ==
- Chinese expedition to Tibet (1720)
- Tibet under Qing rule
- History of Tibet

== Literature ==
- Matthew Kapstein, The Tibetans. Oxford 2006.
- Luciano Petech, China and Tibet in the Early XVIIIth Century. History of the Establishment of Chinese Protecturate in Tibet. Leiden 1950.
- Luciano Petech, Aristocracy and Government in Tibet. 1728-1959. Roma 1973.
- Dieter Schuh (1981). Grundlagen tibetischer Siegelkunde. Eine Untersuchung über tibetische Siegelaufschriften in ´Phags-pa-Schrift. Sankt Augustin: VGH Wissenschaftsverlag.
- Luciano Petech, The Kingdom of Ladakh.c. 950-1842 A. D.. Roma 1977.
- Dieter Schuh, Herrscherurkunden und Privaturkunden aus Westtibet (Ladakh). International Institute for Tibetan and Buddhist Studies, Halle 2008.
- Tsepon W.D. Shakabpa, Tibet: A political history. New Haven & London 1967.
- Tsepon W.D. Shakabpa, One hundred thousand moons. Leiden 2010.

| Preceded by Tagtsepa (Dzungar occupation) | Ruling prince of Tibet (Qing overlordship); 1721–1727 | Succeeded by Polhané Sönam Topgyé |
