= Tagtsepa =

Tagtsepa Lhagyal Rabten (Tibetan: སྟག་རྩེ་པ་ལྷ་རྒྱལ་རབ་བརྟེན་, Wylie: Stag rtse pa lha rgyal rab brtan; Chinese: 達孜巴) (died 1720) was the regent of the Tibetan administration during the 3-year rule of the Dzungar Khanate in Tibet (1717–1720). He carried the Tibetan title sakyong (sa-skyong, "protector of the earth"). After the intervention by the troops of the Chinese Kangxi Emperor, he was executed by the Chinese on the charge of collaboration, thus began the period of Qing rule of Tibet.

== Historical background ==
The Dzungar invasion in Tibet should be regarded against the background of the poor relationship between the pro-Qing dynasty King of Tibet Lhabzang Khan and the Gelug school. The disregard of Lhabzang Khan for the institution of Dalai Lama and fears led the Gelug school of Buddhism (except the Panchen Lama who remained loyal to Lhabzang Khan) to seek the help of the Dzungar Khanate, who were devoted followers of the Gelug school of Buddhism. The warlike Dzungars fought the Qing dynasty for close to a century under their leaders Galdan Boshugtu Khan, Tsewang Rabtan and Galdan Tseren. The Dzungar people had been converted to Tibetan Buddhism in the early 17th century and had a close relation to the Gelugpa church and the Dalai Lamas. The Dzungar conquest of Tibet in 1717 served in the first place as an expansion of the political and religious power basis of the Dzungar Khanate. The plan was to subjugate the Khoshut tribe whose pro-Qing ruler Lhabzang Khan had exerted full power over Tibet since 1705. Another aim was to move the 7th Dalai Lama Kelzang Gyatso to Lhasa; however, the boy was kept safely under Qing control in the Kumbum Monastery, and a Dzungar attempt to take hold of him in 1717 was defeated. However, after the Dzungar conquest, the Dzungars angered the Tibetans by religious persecution, first attacking and killing the Nyingma school and then launching an inquisition to remove non-monks from monasteries and any Gelug Lamas whose behaviour was called into doubt. Moreover, Lhabzang Khan had sent a letter to the Qing requesting for their intervention against the Dzungar attack.

== The role of Tagtsepa at the Dzungar conquest ==
Tagtsepa Lhagyal Rabten was descended from a noble family that resided in the Tagtse Castle to the east of Lhasa, at the right bank of the Kyichu River. For that reason he carried the cognomen Tagtsené (Stag-rtse-nas) or Taktsepa (Stag-rtse-pa), both meaning "the one of Tagtse". He served in the Tibetan administration before and after the power grab of Lhabzang Khan in 1705. He is described as an obese person with skull-like pale face, toothless mouth and an unclear, stammering speech. He no doubt belonged to those Tibetan nobles who had a negative view of Lhabzang Khan and, like the monasteries Sera, Drepung and Ganden, entertained contacts with the Dzungar elite. He appears in the limelight of history in 1717 when Tsewang Rabten's commander Tsering Dondup unexpectedly reached Tibet via the north-western route with 6,000 warriors. Here Tagtsepa belonged to the traitors who informed the Dzungar troops about the lines of defense of Lhabzang Khan and thereby facilitated the advance of the enemy. Lhabzang Khan's son Surya and a number of members of the old Tibetan government fled from the Potala after the death of the ruler, seeking refuge in the estate of Tagtsepa in Tagtse. However, Tagtsepa mercilessly extradited the refugees to the Dzungars. According to another version the refugees were actually delivered by ordinary peasants who were afraid of the Dzungar soldiers.

== Government ==
The victorious Dzungars installed Tagtsepa as leader of the new Tibetan government with the title sakyong. A near-contemporary Catholic missionary writer knows him by royal titles: "Although the Dzungars appointed a Tibetan as king, it was they who governed the country, much more than the king appointed by them". Tibetan sources confirm that real power rested with the troop commander Tsering Dondup who merely used to new regent as a puppet. Tagtsepa endorsed every measure taken by the occupiers, even those that hurt the religious feelings of the Tibetans. The Dzungars started a reign of terror with the aim of plundering the riches of Tibet. The missionary Ippolito Desideri wrote that the occupiers "during the whole of 1718 did nothing but practice unheard-of atrocities on the people of the kingdom". Nevertheless, their attempts to bring the treasures of the land to Dzungaria largely failed, thanks to the resistance of the people. Tagtsepa, in the face of the excesses of foreign occupation, partly tried to support his fellow countrymen. Thus he managed to save Pholhane, the later ruler of Tibet.

== The Chinese march in ==
The Qing government found the Dzungar expansion into Tibet to be a serious threat to their position in Inner Asia. An army of 7,000 was dispatched in 1718 but was annihilated by the Dzungar troops. However, two large imperial armies invaded Tibet anew in 1720. Marching over difficult terrain, the southern army departed from Sichuan and reached Lhasa in September. This time they met with almost no resistance since the Dzungars had concentrated their forces to Damxung County to meet the northern army from Kokonor. Lhasa was occupied and the 7th Dalai Lama was invited to go there.

== Execution ==
Tagtsepa immediately changed sides. The invaders asked him to come out of Tagtse and accompany them to Lhasa. At first he was treated with a measure of deference. When the Dalai Lama entered the pillaged and desolated Potala on 16 October 1720 with a retinue of Mongol, Manchu, Chinese and Tibetan notables, he walked to the left of Dalai Lama and appeared to stand in high favour. Soon, however, accusations came from all sides and the regent was placed under house arrest. Pholhane and the Dalai Lama intervened on his behalf, but to no avail. He was manacled and brought to the Chinese camp at the foot of the Potala together with a number of ministers and officials who were accused of cooperation with the Dzungars. On the 11th month, Tagtsepa and two ministers were led with full ceremony to the banks of the Kyichu River. The accompanying troops shot three salvos, whereupon the three men were beheaded. Their families were deported to Beijing.

The Chinese installed a provisional government after their entrance to Lhasa, presided by the general Yansin. In the next year a new Tibetan government was formed under the nobleman Khangchenné. From the date 1720 one may speak of a concrete Qing protectorate over Tibet.

== See also ==
- Mongol conquest of Tibet
- History of Tibet
- List of rulers of Tibet

== Literature ==
- Luciano Petech, China and Tibet in the Early XVIIIth Century. History of the Establishment of Chinese Protectorate in Tibet. Leiden 1950.
- Sam Van Schaik, Tibet. A History. New Haven & London 2011.
- Tsepon W.D. Shakabpa, One hundred thousand moons. Leiden 2010.

Preceded by Lhabzang Khan (Khoshut Khanate)	Regent of Tibet (Dzungar occupation); 1717–1720	Succeeded by Khangchenné cabinet (Qing overlordship)
