= Dieter Schuh =

Dieter Schuh (German: [ʃuː]; born 1942) is a German Tibetologist, entrepreneur and politician.

== Life ==
Schuh graduated in 1972 from Rheinische Friedrich-Wilhelms University in Bonn and submitted his habilitation in 1976. He has been a Professor of Tibetan Studies since 1978. He was given the title professor emeritus in 2007.

In addition to his academic career Schuh is an entrepreneur.

Since 1983, he and his son Temba have led a company as a property developer, property and asset managers, since the early 1990s established in Halle, Saxony-Anhalt. He also started the weekly magazine New Hallesches daily paper on 1 March 1996, which he disbanded after a few weeks. In 1994 he was an independent member of the Council of the Halle in Saxony-Anhalt.

For research purposes he stayed several times in Tibet and bordering areas. In addition he has published many academic papers and books on subjects related to Tibet. In various publications, he has worked with other Tibetologists including Luciano Petech, Christopher Beckwith and Peter Schwieger. He also edited several books.

In 1983 he developed the book Tibet - dream and reality with a DVD documentary of the snow land of Tibet, the Tibet of his journey along with members of the German ZDF television channel. On his 65th Birthday, the anniversary publication Tibetstudien: Festschrift für Dieter Schuh zum 65. Geburtstag was edited by Petra Maurer and others, with contributions from various tibetologists. He lives in Switzerland.

Schuh is Managing Director of IITB GmbH (International Institute for Tibetan and Buddhist Studies GmbH).
