= Polhané Sönam Topgyé =

Polhané
- Prince Xizang of the Second Rank
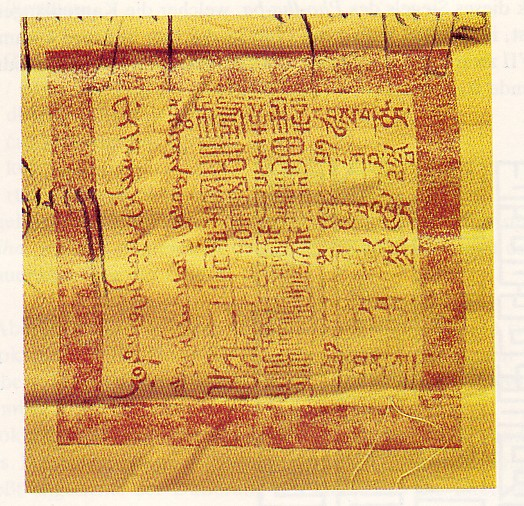
- Seal of the Tibetan ruler Polhané Sönam Topgyé, granted by the Yongzheng Emperor of the Qing dynasty

Prince Xizang of the Second Rank
- Reign: 1727 – 1747
- Predecessor: Khangchenné Sonam Gyalpo
- Successor: Gyurme Namgyal

Kalön of Tibet
- In office: 1727 – 1747; Serving with Khangchenne Sönam Gyalpo, Ngabo Dorje Gyalpo, Lumpanas Tashi Gyalpo, Jaranas Lodrö Gyalpo, Dokhar Tsering Wangyal, Tönpa Sricho Tseten, Gashi Namgyal Tseten, Drongtse Wangyal Tseten and Gashi Pandita
- Monarch: 7th Dalai Lama
- Born: 1689
- Died: 1747 (aged 57–58); Lhasa
Names
- Polhané Sönam Topgyé (ཕོ་ལྷ་ནས་བསོད་ནམས་སྟོབས་རྒྱས)
Regnal name
- Prince Xizang of the Second Rank (西藏郡王)

Polhané Sönam Topgyé (Tibetan: ཕོ་ལྷ་ནས་བསོད་ནམས་སྟོབས་རྒྱས, Wylie: Pho lha nas bsod nams stobs rgyas; Chinese: 頗羅鼐) (1689 – 12 March 1747) was one of the most important political personalities of Tibet in the first half of the 18th century. Between 1727 and 1747 he was effectively the ruling prince of Tibet and carried royal titles during the period of Qing rule of Tibet. He is known as an excellent administrator, a fearsome warrior and a grand strategist. After the troubled years under the reign of Lhazang Khan, the bloody invasion of Tsering Dhondup and the civil war, his government ushered in a relatively long period of stability and internal and external peace for Tibet.

== Family ==
Polhané Sönam Topgyé was born in 1689 in Polha (Pho-lha) as the son of the general Pema Gyalpo and his wife Drolma Butri. His father was an experienced warrior who took part in the war against Ladakh in 1679–1684. He later participated in campaigns against Bhutan and Nepal. His forefathers were local officials in Tsang in the 17th century; his grandfather Asum was endowed with the estate Polha, south of Gyangtse, by the Khoshut king Tenzin Dalai Khan for his services. It was here that Sönam Topgyé grew up. In his young years he received teachings in the Mindroling Monastery which belonged to the Nyingma school, and also by the Panchen Lama. While his given name was Sönam Topgyé, he is usually known by the cognomen Polhané (the one from Polha).

== Career under Lhabzang Khan ==
Shortly after his marriage in 1707, Polhané traveled to Lhasa where he was presented to the ruler Lhabzang Khan. The ruler confirmed him in his possession of the estate that he had inherited from his deceased father. Now he began a typical official career and was educated in the Ministry of Finance (rTsis khang) in Lhasa. After some years he was appointed district judge in Gyangtse. In 1714 he received his first military command. He successfully led an entire detachment against Bhutan, although the war as such was lost by the Tibetans. After the invasion of Tibet by the Dzungars he took part in the organization of the Tibetan defense lines. He was present during the final defense of Lhasa.

== Resistance against the Dzungars 1717 to 1720 ==
Lhasa fell in the hands of the Dzungars because of treason from some defenders, and Lhabzang Khan was killed in the melée. Pholhané managed to take refuge in the Drepung Monastery. In the following months, the Dzungars tried to eliminate followers of Lhabzang Khan. Pholhané was captured and brought naked through the streets of Lhasa. After having been whipped with 15 lashes he was cast in prison. He managed to survive since old friends brought him food. Finally, he was released through the intervention of Tagtsepa, leader of the Tibetan government that was formed under the Dzungars. Pholhané then returned to Tsang. Here he began to collaborate with Khangchenné Sönam Gyalpo who had been appointed governor of Ngari by Lhabzang Khan and continued to rule there in spite of the Dzungars. They organized resistance against the invaders until the grand Chinese army sent by the Kangxi Emperor marched into Lhasa in September 1720.

== Participation in the cabinet 1721 to 1727 ==
Immediately after their arrival to Lhasa, the representatives of the Manchu-led Qing dynasty organized a provisional military government under the general Yansin. After the return of the imperial army, a garrison of 3,000 men stayed in Lhasa. This troop was replaced in 1723. Two officials called zongli and two other termed xieli were placed as representatives of the emperor and advisers to the Tibetan government. The provisional military government was replaced in 1721 by a cabinet under the leadership of Khangchenné, who retained the jurisdiction over Ngari. The other two ministers were Ngaphöpa Dorje Gyalpo (d. 1728) and Lumpané Tashi Gyalpo (d. 1728). Khangchenné appointed Polhané as personal adjutant, and he received the jurisdiction over the Tsang province. He submitted a proposal that the hundreds of Nyingma monasteries and temples which had been ruined by the Dzungars should be restored with government assistance. This was taken up badly by many, especially by the Seventh Dalai Lama and his father who viewed the Nyimgma as heretic.

In 1723 he and Charaba Lotro Gyalpo were appointed regular members of the cabinet, which from now on consisted of five members. The basic principle of this new administrative structure of Tibet was, that the members of the cabinet acted as ruling princes over the regions standing under them (Ü, Kongpo, Tsang, and Ngari), having their particular military resources and means of income. This certainly weakened the position of Tibet vis-à-vis its neighbours, but also raised the danger of inner dissent, if the leading politicians could not agree. In fact, there was great disharmony between the cabinet members from the start. The tension eventually exploded in 1727 when Khangchenné died under the knives of his peers. Polhané was luckily absent from Lhasa at the time, since his wife was ill and he had hastened to her sickbed at his estate.

== The civil war of 1727-1728 ==
Immediately after Khangchenné's assassination, Ngaphöpa, Lumpané and Charaba took over power in Lhasa, supported by the father of the Dalai Lama, Sönam Dargye. They mobilized the troops in their respective territories, in particular from Kongpo and Ü. 300 men were sent to catch Polhané but failed to do so. The latter boded up troops from Tsang. He allied with Khangchenné's brother Gashiba Tseten Tashi who had taken over governance in Ngari in 1725. Meanwhile, he sent an express envoy to inform the court in China. After a half year of fighting at Gyangtse, Ngaphöpa was defeated. Polhané marched towards Lhasa with 9,000 troops, occupied the city and laid siege to the Potala Palace where his opponents and the ambans had taken refuge. Dalai Lama was allowed to take sanctuary in the Drepung Monastery, but Polhané's adversaries were taken prisoners on 5 July 1728. Polhané immediately communicated his victory to the Yongzheng Emperor of the Qing dynasty. As the imperial troops arrived on 4 September 1728 the civil war had already been concluded. One of the main tasks of the arriving Chinese was to find the main culprits behind the eruption of the war. Ngaphöpa and Lumpané were publicly executed by slow slicing, two clerics were hanged, and 13 others were beheaded. In addition, the close kin of the culprits were executed as well, including small children.

On 1 November 1728, after the Qing reconquest of Lhasa in Tibet, several Tibetan rebels were sliced to death by Qing Manchu officers and officials. The Qing Manchu President of the Board of Civil Office, Jalangga, Mongol sub-chancellor Sen-ge and brigadier-general Manchu Mala ordered the Tibetan rebels Lum-pa-nas and Na-p'od-pa to be sliced to death. They ordered gZims-dpon C'os-ac'ad (Hsi-mu-pen ch'ui-cha-t'e), son of Lum-pa-nas and rNog Tarqan bsKal-bzajn-c'os-adar and dKon-mc'og-lha-sgrub (Kun-ch'u-k'o-la-ku-pu) and dGa'-ldan-p'un-ts'ogs (K'a-erh-tan-p'en-ch'u-k'o), sons of Na-p'od-pa to be beheaded. Byams-pa (Cha-mu-pa) and his brother Lhag-gsan (La-k'o-sang) and their brothers, daughters, wives and mother were exiled after their father sByar-ra-nas was beheaded. The Manchus wrote that they "set an example" by forcing the Tibetans to publicly watch the executions of Tibetan rebels of slicing like Na-p'od-pa since they said it was the Tibetan's nature to be cruel. The exiled Tibetans were enslaved and given as slaves to soldiers in Ching-chou (Jingzhou), K'ang-zhou (Kangzhou) and Chiang-ning (Jiangning) in the marshall-residences there. The Tibetan rNam-rgyal-grva-ts'an college administrator (gner-adsin) and sKyor'lun Lama were tied together with Lum-pa-nas and Na-p'od-pa on 4 scaffolds (k'rims-sin) to be sliced. The Manchus used muskets to fire 3 salvoes and then the Manchus strangled the 2 Lamas while slicing Lum-pa-nas and Na-p'od-pa to death while they beheaded the 13 other rebel leaders. The Tibetan population was depressed by the scene and the writer continued to feel sad as he described it 5 years later. All relatives of the Tibetan rebels including little children were executed by the Qing Manchus except the exiled and deported family of sByar-ra-ba which was condemned to be slaves. The public executions spectacle worked on the Tibetans since they were "cowed into submission" by the Qing. Polhané, who was a collaborator with the Qing, himself also felt sad at his fellow Tibetans being executed in this manner and he prayed for them. All of this was included in a report by General Yue Zhongqi and sent to the Qing emperor at the time, the Yongzheng Emperor.

== Government 1729-1735 ==
Now Beijing interfered strongly in the organization of the civil and military administration of Tibet. Polhané was once again given the jurisdiction over Tsang. Two other ministers, namely Sicho Tseten and Tsering Wanggyal, were appointed to govern Lhasa and Ü. However, they stood entirely under the direction of Pholhané. Two Manchu representatives or ambans watched over the government of Polhané. The Panchen Lama, Lobsang Yeshe (d. 1737), was given great authority which de facto made him the ruler of western Tsang. The borders in East Tibet (1724, Amdo, 1727, Kham) were much altered, and Lhasa was permanently occupied by imperial troops, plus 2,000 men who supported the ambans. Under the pretext of going on a tour to Beijing, the Seventh Dalai Lama was sent in exile to Garthar near Lithang for six years (1728–1735). The actual reason was that his father had played a dubious role during the civil war and had to be kept far away from the government. Another reason was supposedly that the Dalai Lama was to be kept safe from the Dzungars.

== Pholhané as ruling prince 1735-1747 ==
As time passed Polhané became ever more independent and posed as a king or ruling prince of sorts (honorary royal titles bestowed by the emperor in 1731 and 1739). The Tibetans usually knew him by the title miwang, "ruler of men". The protector status of the Manchu rulers was handled more as a formality. Still, he took care to orient his politics so as to take the powers of the imperial court into account. Since his trustworthiness and loyalty to the imperial dynasty could not be questioned, the troops stationed in Lhasa were reduced to 500 men in 1733. At the same time, Polhané built up a professional army consisting of 15,000 infantry and 10,000 cavalry. He ordered the borders to be guarded and secured and built military barracks all over the land. In 1729 he organized a postal system that secured the transmission of messages from Ngari to Lhasa and from Lhasa to East Tibet. This postal system was inspired by Chinese model and replaced the system instigated by the Chinese in 1720, especially in East Tibet. In the time of Polhané even the Chinese officials in Lhasa used this postal system for the communications with the imperial court. In the sphere of culture Polhané sponsored the first printed edition of the Buddhist canon.

In sum, Polhané's tenure is remembered as being peaceful, stable and welfare oriented.

== Succession ==
After Polhané's death in 1747, the imperial government confirmed his second son Gyurme Namgyal as his successor. Gyurme Namgyal was murdered in 1750 by the two ambans. The deed provoked some unrest among the population under the leadership of the chief groom of the murdered leader, Lobsang Tashi. Imperial troops intervened anew, after which the government was handed over to the Seventh Dalai Lama.

== See also ==
- Tibet under Qing rule
- History of Tibet

== Sources ==
- Roland Barraux (1995), Die Geschichte der Dalai Lamas - Göttliches Mitleid und irdische Politik. Düsseldorf.
- Dungkar Lobsang Thrinle, "Tshering Wanggyel and his Pholhane-biography" (Tibetan, in the issue of nationality Sichuan Publishing)
- K. Kollmar-Paulenz (2006), Kleine Geschichte Tibets. München.
- Alex McKay (ed.) (2003), The history of Tibet, Vols. I-III. London & New York: Routledge.
- Dan Martin, Yael Bentor (ed.) (1997), Tibetan Histories: A Bibliography of Tibetan-Language Historical Works. London: Serindia, ISBN 0906026431 (Nos. 270, 271) - ( Addenda et Corrigenda )
- Luciano Petech (1972), China and Tibet in the Early XVIIIth Century. History of the Establishment of Chinese Protecturate in Tibet. Leiden.
- Luciano Petech (1973), Aristocracy and Government in Tibet. 1728-1959. Roma.
- Dieter Schuh (1981). Grundlagen tibetischer Siegelkunde. Eine Untersuchung über tibetische Siegelaufschriften in ´Phags-pa-Schrift. Sankt Augustin: VGH Wissenschaftsverlag.
- Hugh Richardson (1984). Tibet & its history. Boston & London: Shambhala.
- Tsepon W. D. Shakabpa (1967), Tibet: A political history. New York.
- Van Schaik, Sam (2011). Tibet: A History. New Haven: Yale University Press. p. 152. ISBN 978-0300194104.

Preceded by Khangchenné cabinet	Ruling prince of Tibet (Qing overlordship); 1728–1747	Succeeded by Gyurme Namgyal
