= Luciano Petech =

Italian historian (1914–2010)

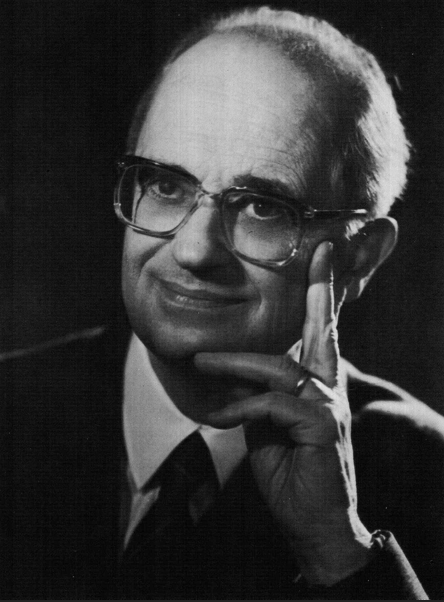
Petech c. 1970

Luciano Petech (Italian pronunciation: [luˈtʃaːno peˈtɛk]; 8 June 1914 in Trieste – 29 September 2010 in Rome) was an Italian scholar of Himalayan history and the early relations between Tibet, Nepal and Italy. He was Chair of History of Eastern Asia at the University of Rome from 1955 to 1984. He was a student of the Italian explorer, academic, and scholar Giuseppe Tucci.

Luciano Petech was born in 1914 and retired in 1984. He learned several European languages, including Latin, as well as Asian languages such as Tibetan, Chinese, Japanese, Newari, Sanskrit, Arabic, Hindi and Urdu.

== Biography ==
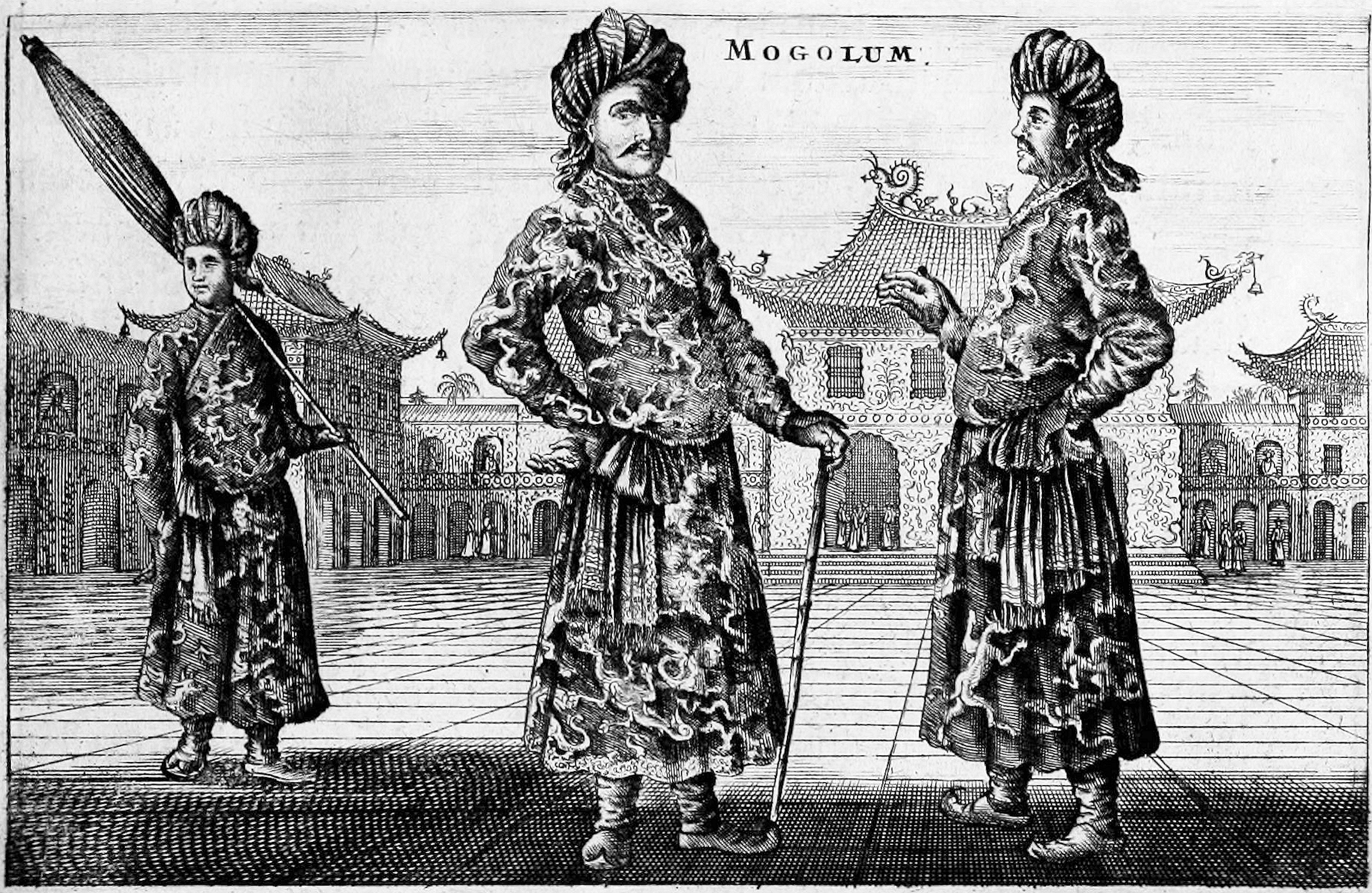
A delegation from the Western Regions, seen in Beijing by Johan Nieuhof in 1656, who took them for emissaries of the Moghuls of India. Petech thinks the delegation are visitors from Turfan in Moghulistan instead.

Petech began his teaching career in India at 25 years old, as a reader in Italian at the University of Allahabad from 1938 to 1946. His first recorded article is for the Calcutta Review in 1939. His subject was the dramas and stories of the great Italian author Luigi Pirandello, who had recently died two years after being awarded the Nobel Prize in Literature. He says “the people” in Italy had unfairly turned their backs on the intellectual Pirandello as unrepresentative of the times (Petech 1939: 13) and as not speaking to their hearts (idem: 24).

With the outbreak of World War II, as an Italian enemy alien in British India, Petech spent most of that time in a civil internment camp. Petech used this time to study Tibetan literature and write an article on the chronological system of the 15th-century Blue Annals of Tibet. Unlike Tucci, a staunch collaborator with the Fascist regime, Petech was apolitical.

Petech returned to Europe in 1947, to temporary teaching appointments at the Istituto Orientale of Naples and University of Rome. For the next 8 years, he wrote 30 pieces of varying length on Asia, always focused on the meeting of different cultures from Asia or Europe, in areas bordering India.

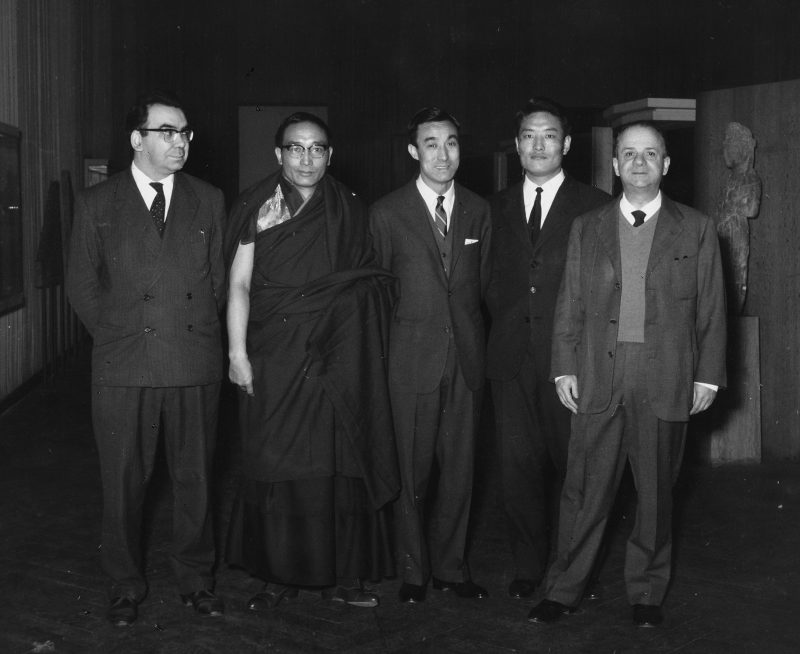
From left: Lionello Lanciotti, Geshe Jampel Singe, Lobsang Samten, Namkhai Norbu and Luciano Petech at IsMEO, Rome, in 1961.

From 1955 to 1984, he held the chair of History of Eastern Asia in Rome University, publishing 14 books and over 80 articles on Asia. At the end of this period, the foreword to the anthology of his selected articles, made to mark his retirement, praised his ‘objective, calm and sensible judgment, his willingness to cooperate, and his learning’ (Petech 1988: viii).

These traits are evident in his many works. In his books on Ladakh, Nepal and Tibet from medieval to modern times, his approach has the outward appearance of “history”—unimpeded by philosophy or superstition—unlocked through a serious and critical engagement with historical sources that are described before any of the events described in them.

In his magisterial seven volume ‘I Missionari Italiani nel Tibet e nel Nepal, Petech made available a mine of contemporary missionary accounts which are still invaluable source materials.

Petech’s monographs attempt to bring Himalayan history into the light of world history. This aim was always to be appreciated, and, as Herbert Franke noted in 1950 when Petech published “China and Tibet in the early 18th century”,

It may be considered as a fortunate coincidence... just now when the Chinese government tries to establish again its suzerainty over the land of snow because it will enable the reader to get a clear notion how the Chinese protectorate in Tibet came into being. (Franke 1950)

These are sentiments with which many would thoroughly agree. However, Petech’s early attempts also tend to subsume unique events within western explanatory frameworks. In 1947 he wrote:

As to Ladakh, there is little to be said. It suffered the fate of all countries which tried to build an empire without that indispensable foundation, a sufficiently large population of the home country. (1988 [1947]: 39)

This attempt to universalise the process of empire-building also has politically loaded connotations in a time when Italy had just failed to regain the Roman Empire, thwarted by the dwindling imperial powers of Britain and France and the new empire, America.

When he returned to the topic of Ladakh in 1977, he admitted that ‘I found my first effort hopelessly obsolete’ (1977: xi). His second treatment is more nuanced, and he finally explains the collapse of Ladakhi power with more of an emphasis on economic overstretch (idem: 79).

Central Tibet and the Mongols, Petech’s latest book-length study, is a more fluidly written narrative, character-led and more descriptive in tone. It is still authoritative, and has naturally overtaken Tucci’s work on the same period. As Elliot Sperling wrote in his 1995 review:

...since the 1949 publication of Giuseppe Tucci’s Tibetan Painted scrolls [and in] the absence of any single monograph dedicated to the public, this last work was often taken by default as the main secondary source on the subject....[While] “Central Tibet and the Mongols” is a relatively short work and leaves a few subjects less than fully explored... [it] is now the basic secondary source to which students of Yuan-Tibetan relations must turn. (Journal of the American Oriental Society 115.2 (1995): 342–3)

Petech has several students, including Elena De Rossi Filibeck in Tibetan studies.

Luciano Petech died in his home on 19 September 2010.
