= Upper Mongols =

Ethnic group in Qinghai, China

Regions with significant populations
- China: 100,000 (2009)

Languages
- Khoshut dialect of Oirat Mongolian

Religion
- Tibetan Buddhism and Shamanism

Related ethnic groups
- Oirats, Mongols, Mongols in China

Upper Mongols

Mongolian name
- Mongolian Cyrillic: Дээд монгол
- Mongolian script: ᠲᠡᠭᠡᠲᠦ ᠮᠣᠩᠭᠣᠯ

Köke Nuur / Qinghai Mongols

Chinese name
- Traditional Chinese: 青海蒙古
- Simplified Chinese: 青海蒙古
- Literal meaning: Blue lake Mongol
Transcriptions
Standard Mandarin
- Hanyu Pinyin: Qīnghǎi Měnggǔ

Mongolian name
- Mongolian Cyrillic: Хөх нуурын Монгол
- Mongolian script: ᠬᠥᠬᠡ ᠨᠠᠭᠤᠷ ᠤᠨ ᠮᠣᠩᠭᠣᠯ

The Upper Mongols, also known as the Köke Nuur Mongols or Qinghai Mongols, are ethnic Mongol people of Oirat and Khalkha origin who settled around the Qinghai Lake in so-called Upper Mongolia (present-day Qinghai). As part of the Khoshut Khanate of Qaidam Basin and the Qinghai Lake, they played a major role in Sino–Mongol–Tibetan politics during the 17th and 18th centuries. The Upper Mongols adopted Tibetan dress and jewelry despite still living in the traditional Mongolian ger and writing in the script.

== History ==
After the disintegration of the Proto-Mongolic Xianbei state, nomadic groups such as the (Monguor) migrated under the rule of their Khan, Tuyuhun, from their original settlements on the Liaodong Peninsula to the western region of modern Qinghai. The Tuyuhun Empire (284–670) stretched 1,500 kilometers from east to west and 1,000 kilometers from north to south.

Although, the Mongols of the Gansu–Qinghai Lake areas under the rule of the Yuan dynasty submitted to the Ming dynasty after the Yuan dynasty's fall in 1368, the Upper Mongols came there in 16th and 17th centuries. Many Mongol emperors and rulers of the Northern Yuan dynasty such as Dayan Khan, Ligdan Khan, the Ordos and Tümed princes invaded, or took refuge, in Qinghai from 1509 to 1632. The Tümed Mongols ruled in the Ordos region and they gradually extended their domain into northeastern Qinghai.

The Khoshut's leader Toro Baikhu Güshi Khan defeated all the Dalai Lama V's enemies in 1637–1642. He was enthroned by the Dalai Lama as Khan of Tibet. His grandson and second successor Gonchug Dalai Khan (1669–98) welcomed dissident Dzungars when Galdan Khan began persecuting Guushi Khan's relatives and descendants.

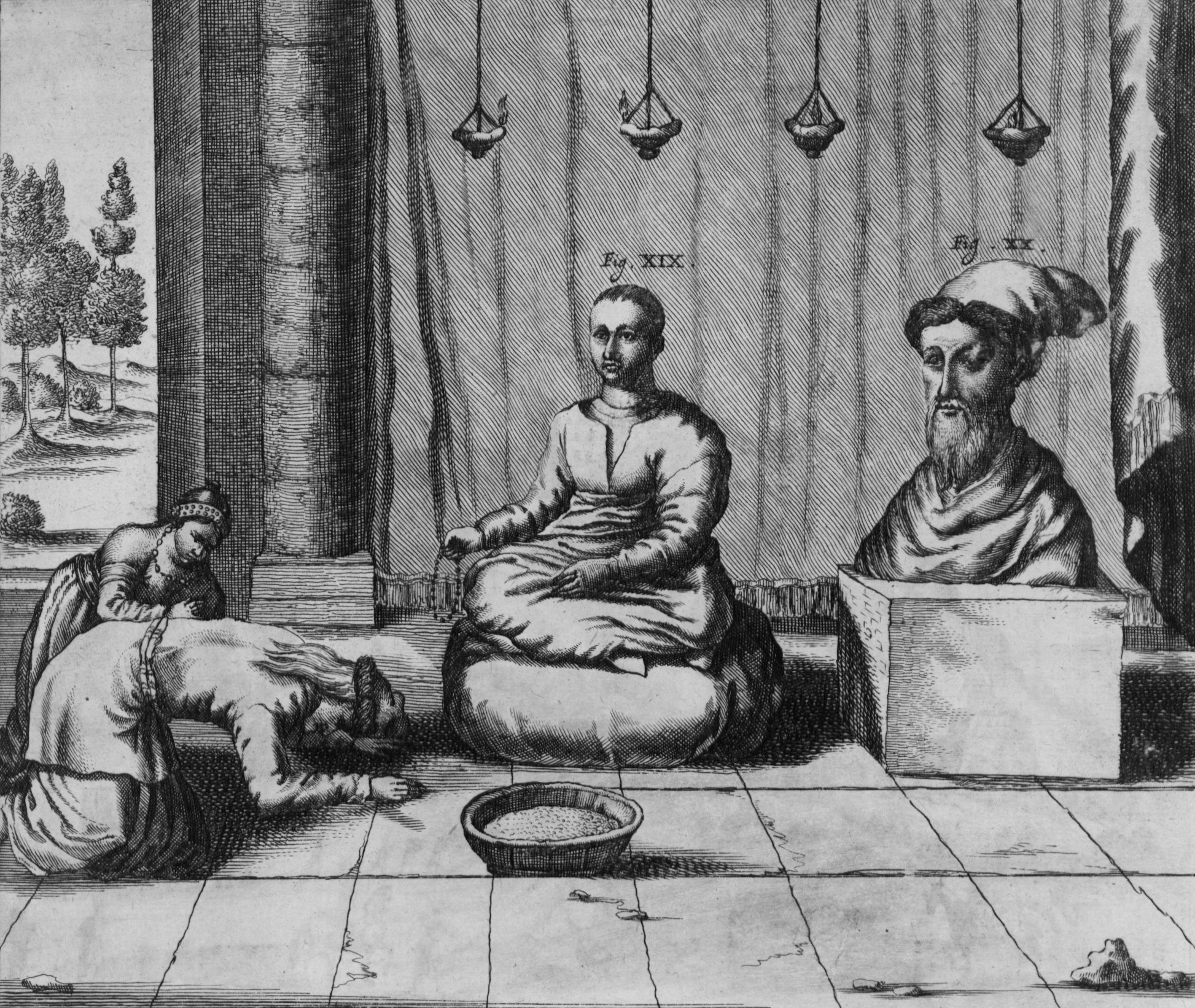
Statue of Güshi Khan (right) in the Dalai Lama's palace, next to the statue of the Dalai Lama himself (left). (Drawing by Johann Grueber, 1661)

With the defeat of Galdan in 1697, Dalai Khung Taiji Dashi Batur submitted to the Kangxi Emperor of the Qing dynasty in a personal audience. In 1705, with the approval of the Kangxi Emperor of the Manchu Qing dynasty, Lha-bzang Khan of the Khoshud deposed the regent and sent the 6th Dalai Lama to Beijing; the 6th Dalai Lama died soon after, probably near Qinghai Lake (Koko nur) in Amdo. The Dzungar Mongols invaded Tibet in 1717, and held the entire region until their final defeat by the Qing imperial army in 1720, thus began the period of Qing rule of Tibet.

The Upper Mongolia or the Khoshut Khanate was conquered in 1717 and 80,000 people were killed. By that period, Upper Mongolian population reached 200,000. The Upper Mongols revolted against the Manchu Qing dynasty under rule of the prince Lubsan Danzan in 1723 but they were defeated. Lubsan Danzan fled to the Dzungar Khanate and eventually surrendered to the Qing dynasty in 1755.

The Upper Mongols in Northwest China revived their cultural ties with Inner Mongolia with the liberalization in 1979. The Tibetan culture strongly influenced them, however they use Mongolian script unlike other major Oirat tribes that use Zaja Pandita's Todo Bichig Clear script.

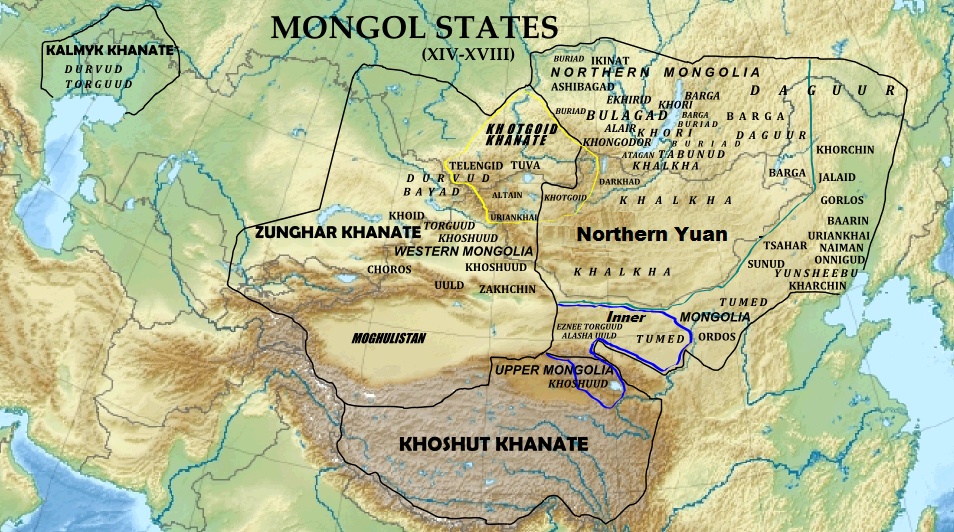
The Khoshut Khanate (1642–1717) based in the Tibetan Plateau.

The separation of the Tibetans from the Mongolian banners weakened the Upper Mongols. After 1775, the Tibetans made increasingly bold attacks on the Mongols. Hence, small group of the Upper Mongols fled to Gansu to escape the Tibetan nomads and they formed Subei Mongol county. In 1821 the Tibetan nomads made a mass migration north, sweeping away the Qinghai Mongol banners between the Yellow River and Qinghai Lake due to the internal strife between the Tibetans. In 1897 the Hui Muslims plundered the Upper Mongols.

== Ethnic groups of the Upper Mongols ==
Not all Upper Mongols are Khoshut Oirats; there are a few Khalkha, Choros and Torghuts. The Ligdan Khan came to Upper Mongolia with 150,000–200,000 Chahar people (30,000–40,000 soldiers) and his ally Tsogt Taij came with 40,000 Khalkha soldiers, but 70%–90% of them were killed by disease and by the Güshi Khan's army. Upper Mongolia had 29 hoshuns (21 Khoshut, 2 Choros, 4 Torghut, 1 Khalkha) in the early 20th century. Now there are 9 hoshuns of the Upper Mongols. 80,000–90,000 Upper Mongols live in the Qinghai region and 10,000 Upper Mongols live in Subei Mongol Autonomous County (2010).

- Choros-Western Mongols
- Khalkha-Eastern Mongols
- Khoshut-Western Mongols
- Torghut-Western Mongols
