= Battle of the Bloody Hills (1637) =

Battle between Pro-Gelug and Anti-Gelug Mongols

- Part of Khoshut intervention in Tibet and the Oirat–Khalkha Wars
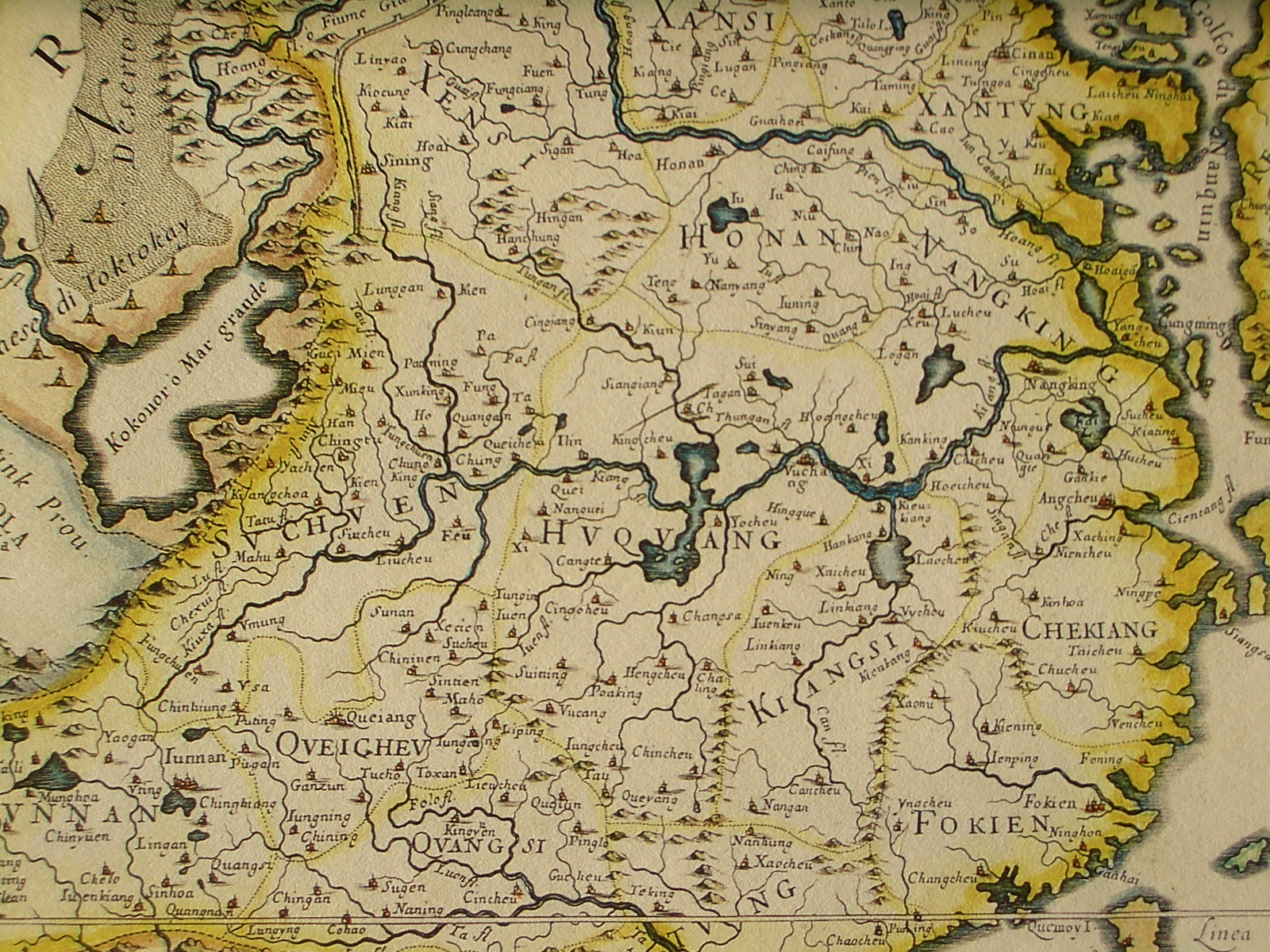
- Map of the Lake Qinghai in 1682
Date	The Spring of 1637
Location	Kokonoor Gorge, Amdo or Qinghai, China 37.00°N 100.08°E
Result	Oirat Victory: Suppression of Khalkha presence in Amdo; Creation of the Khoshut Khanate
Territorial changes	Khoshuts annex the region of Qinghai

Belligerents
Pro-Gelugpa Oirat Coalition: (Khoshut Khanate) Khoshuts; Dzungar Khanate	Anti-Gelugpa Khalkha Coalition: Khalkhas

Commanders and leaders
Pro-Gelugpa Oirat Coalition: (Khoshut Khanate) Torobaikhu (Khoshut Khanate) Ochirtu (Khoshut Khanate) Ablai tayiji (Dzungar Khanate) Erdeni Batur	Anti-Gelugpa Khalkha Coalition: Choghtu Khong Tayiji †

Strength
10,000	30,000

Casualties and losses
Unknown	Heavy
- Location within Qinghai

The Battle of the Bloody Hills, also known as the Battle of Olango, was fought in the spring of 1637 by an Oirat-led coalition under the Khoshut chief Torobaikhu and supported by the Dzungar prince Erdeni Batur in Amdo against the Khalkha prince Choghtu Khong Tayiji. The battle resulted in an Oirat victory, creating the Khoshut Khanate and contributing to the elimination of the Karmapa threat.

The battle was a religious war between the Gelugpa and the Karmapa sects of Tibetan Buddhism and formed part of the Oirat–Khalkha Wars. The battle removed a major supporter of the Karmapa, allowing the Oirats to establish permanent control over the Qinghai region and to initiate the Khoshut intervention, which later unified Tibet and contributed to the patronage of the Gelugpa as the dominant Buddhist sect in Mongolia.

== Background ==
In 1625, after the events of the Oirat War of Independence, a conflict broke out within the Oirat Confederation between Chokhur and Torobaikhu's elder brother Baibaghas over succession, during which Baibaghas was killed in action. This directly caused Torobaikhu, the younger brother of Baibaghas, to pursue Chokhur from Ishim to the Tobol River to seek revenge, resulting in the death of Chokhur. Torobaikhu later succeeded Baibaghas as the chief of the Khoshuts in 1630.

Meanwhile, in Tibet, a religious conflict broke out between the Gelugpa and Karmapa schools. During that period, Sonam Rapten, the principal attendant of the 5th Dalai Lama, sent a letter to Dzungaria in 1634 seeking support from the Oirats, to end the persecutions and suppress the Karmapa and Bon leagues. The Tsangpa King, Karma Tenkyong, had begun the persecution of the Gelug schools along with the Bonpo King of Beri in Kham, as well as forming an alliance between Choghtu Khong Tayiji of the Khalkha who supported the Karmapa and Ligdan Khan of the Chahar, who supported the Bonpo. The Khalkhas soon settled in Amdo, migrating alongside Ligdan Khan, who later died en route while moving to support the Tsangpa. This caused a civil war among the Khalkhas after Choghtu had arrived at Lake Qinghai, prompting Sonam Rapten to seek their assistance.

The Oirats agreed to intervene due to Torobaikhu's devotion to the Gelugpa sect and the persecution of their newly adopted Gelugpa faith—a pro-Gelugpa Oirat army coalition of 10,000 men was formed—including the forces of Erdeni and his cousins Ablai tayiji and Ochirtu in order to defeat the anti-Gelugpa Khalkhas on Amdo, reportedly claiming to be pilgrims in order to reach the region.

== Battle ==
The battle took place in the spring of 1637, in the Lake Qinghai region. Several days later, near Lake Qinghai, the Oirats attacked Choghtu's army at Olango, where they encircled the Khalkha army between two hills. The Oirats soon found Choghtu, who attempted to flee from the battle, hid in a marmot hole and was discovered and killed by Güshi's brother. Choghtu's remaining forces were defeated in Khargai and executed by the Oirat forces. According to Shakabpa, the Khalkhas stationed at Namtso were alerted that their leader had been killed and his army had suffered severe losses. This caused them to join the Tsangpa army and remain in the region instead of returning to Amdo to relieve their former positions.

== Aftermath ==
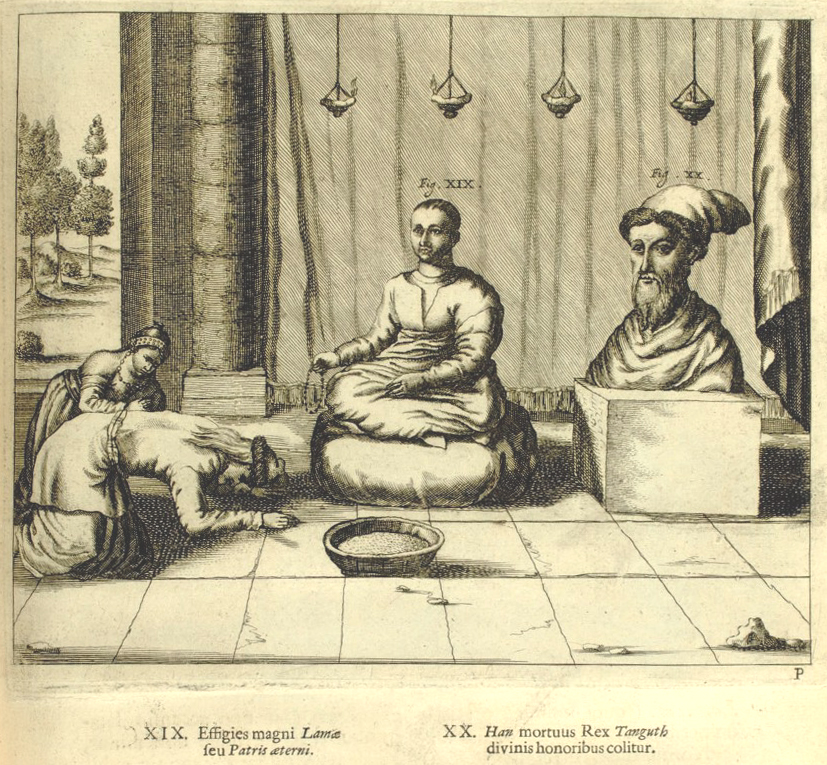
Statues of the Fifth Dalai Lama and Güshi Khan

After Choghtu's death, the Khalkhas' presence on Amdo was suppressed following the Qing dynasty's subjugation of them. In 1638, Torobaikhi and the other leaders of the coalition visited Lhasa, with the Fifth Dalai Lama blessing them. He conferred upon Torobaikhu the titles Güshi or Güshri, Holder of the Doctrine Chogyal, and Khagan, against Borjigid tradition, as the Borjigids were direct descendants of Genghis Khan. Others received blessings such as Dzasa, Da Lama, Dayan, and more, Kharkhul's son Erdeni was granted the title of Batur Khong Tayiji and married Güshi's daughter, Amin Dara, and returned to the Dzungar Khanate. Following the battle, the Khoshuts settled in Amdo, during which about 100,000 households migrated to Güshi's new realm. Later, Gelugpa spies discovered a possible coalition, particularly between the Tsangpa dynasty and the Beri kingdom. They reported it to Güshi Khan. In 1639, he invaded Kham and later advanced into Ü-Tsang in 1641, unifying Tibet in the process.

== Popular culture ==
The 1945 film Tsogt taij references the battle between the Khalkhas and the Oirats, and depicts Choghtu as a national hero while also showing a scene with an Oirat soldier holding Choghtu's severed head wrapped in a blanket.
