= Tenzin Dalai Khan =

Dalai Khan Далай Хаан ཏཱ་ལའི་ཧན
- Khan; Protector-ruler of Tibet

3rd khan of the Khoshut Khanate
- Reign: 1668-1696 or 1701
- Predecessor: Dayan Khan
- Successor: Tenzin Wangchuk Khan
- Born: Phuntsok (Пунцаг, ཕུན་ཚོགས)
- Died: 1696 or 1701; Ü-Tsang, Tibet
Regnal name
- Gonchig Dalai Khan (Гончиг Далай Хаан); Tenzin Dalai Khan (བསྟན་འཛིན་ཏཱ་ལའི་ཧན)
- House: Borjigin
- Dynasty: Khoshut Khanate
- Father: Dayan Khan

Tenzin Dalai Khan (Mongolian: ᠭᠣᠨᠴᠣᠭᠳᠠᠯᠠᠢᠬᠠᠭᠠᠨ gončuɣ dalai qaɣan, Гончиг Далай Хаан Gonchig Dalai Khaan, died 1696 or 1701) was the third khan of the Khoshut Khanate and protector-king of Tibet. He ruled from 1668 to 1696 (or 1701), in the time of the Fifth and Sixth Dalai Lamas.

== Succession ==
Tenzin Dalai Khan, also known as Konchok Dalai Khan, is usually depicted as the son of Dayan Khan who ruled as the protector-king ("Dharma king, Protector of the Faith") in 1655-1668. Another version makes him one of the younger sons of the founder of the line, Güshi Khan. When Dayan Khan died in 1668, he was succeeded by Tenzin Dalai Khan. Incidentally the Tibetan regent (desi) Trinley Gyatso died at the same time and was succeeded by Lozang Thuthob. The two new leaders were immediately faced with an attack from Bhutan. Bhutanese forces assaulted the Achok tribe of the Monpa people, who live in the far south-east of Tibet and present-day Arunachal Pradesh. The Achok asked the Tibetan rulers for assistance and such was given. A campaign was carried out at the end of 1668 and reached a satisfactory conclusion. New trouble broke out in 1675 since the Bhutanese attacked Sikkim and Achok. Tibetan and Mongol troops defeated the adversary in a bloody campaign, regained the lost territories and forced the Bhutanese out of Sikkim.

== Reign ==
The reign of Tenzin Dalai Khan started inauspiciously. There were disturbances in the royal family in 1670 and there was therefore dissention among the Orö (Oirat) Mongols. The abbot of Gangchen, Konchok Rinchen, was dispatched by the Dalai Lama government and admonished the parties to keep the peace. An agreement was reached. Tenzin Dalai Khan then appeared in Lhasa in 1671 and was formally enthroned as "king of Tibet" on 11 April. He was, however, a rather effaced and inactive type and stood in the shadow of the imposing Fifth Dalai Lama and the gifted desi Sangye Gyatso. Only three documents are known to have been issued by him, while there are numerous preserved documents by Dalai Lama and his regent. One of them, from 1685, reads "Document of King Tenzin Dalai, the one who - by the order of the Dalai Lama Vajradhara - was empowered as the performer of the two [religious and secular] systems". This clearly shows that he accepted a subordinated position vis-à-vis the Dalai Lama. He nevertheless played a role when hostilities with the kingdom of Ladakh erupted in 1679. Mongol and Tibetan troops were sent westwards under the first cousin of the king, Ganden Tsewang Palzang. The troops fought their way past the mountain passes of West Tibet and were able to besiege the Ladakhi ruler Deleg Namgyal in his fortified capital Basgo. After a Bhutanese incarnate lama had mediated, an agreement was eventually reached. The Ladakhi ruler gave up Guge, Purang and Rudok to the Dalai Lama state. Ganden Tsewang Palzang was subsequently sent back to keep control over the subjugated area.

== Final years ==
The later years of Tenzin Dalai Khan are not much spoken of in the texts. He did not investigate the whereabouts of the Fifth Dalai Lama, whose death in 1682 was kept secret for many years by Sangye Gyatso. The Dzungar Khanate evolved as a major Inner Asian power in this era; its royal family was descended from one of the main allies of Güshi Khan and there were many marital ties between them and the Khoshut elite. Thus a daughter of Tenzin Dalai Khan, Kunga Rabten, married the Dzungar khong tayiji Tsewang Rabtan who later played a fateful role in the history of Tibet. While Tenzin Dalai was acknowledged as the chogyal or Dharma king of Tibet, there were other Khoshut princes who had a role in local governance. By the end of the 17th century, two descendants of Güshi Khan called Lobsang Tenzin and Erdeni Jinong dominated Amdo and did not conform to the main ruling line. Towards the end of Tenzin Dalai's life, his elder son Tenzin Wangchuk Khan fell out with his younger brother Lhazang Khan. The desi Sangye Gyatso tried to mediate via envoys, but there were bloody disputes among the Khoshut elite at this time, and the meeting was not successful. The date of Tenzin Dalai Khan's death is given differently in the literature: 1696, 21 January 1701, 1703. At any rate he was briefly succeeded by his elder son Tenzin Wangchuk Khan, soon to be murdered at the instigation of Lhazang Khan.

Preceded by Dayan Khan	Khan of the Khoshut Khanate; Protector-ruler of Tibet; 1668–1696	Succeeded by Tenzin Wangchuk Khan
