= Samdrup Pohang =

Coordinates: 29.651991°N 91.131442°E

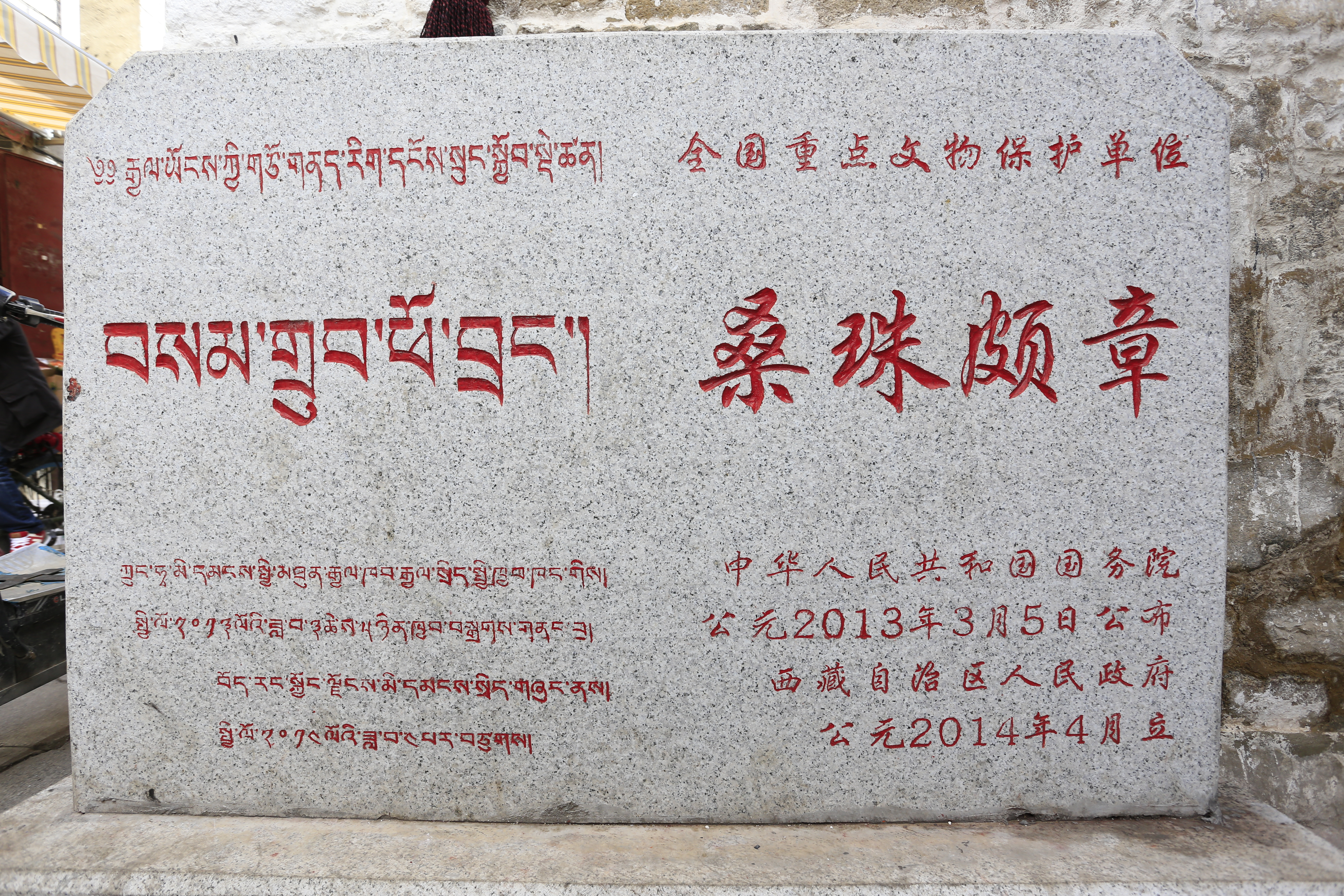
Samdrup Pohang in 2014

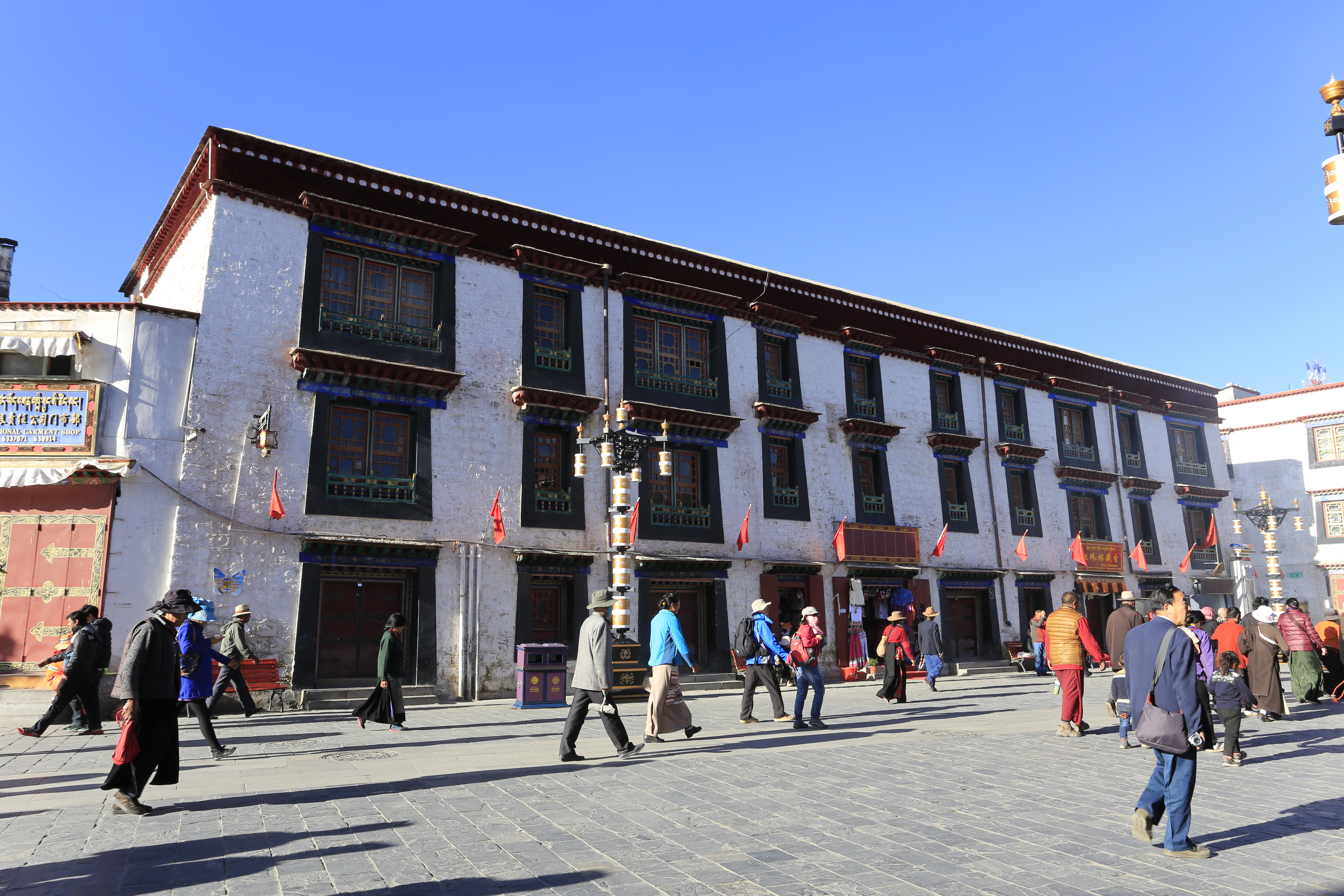
Samdrup Pohang in 2014

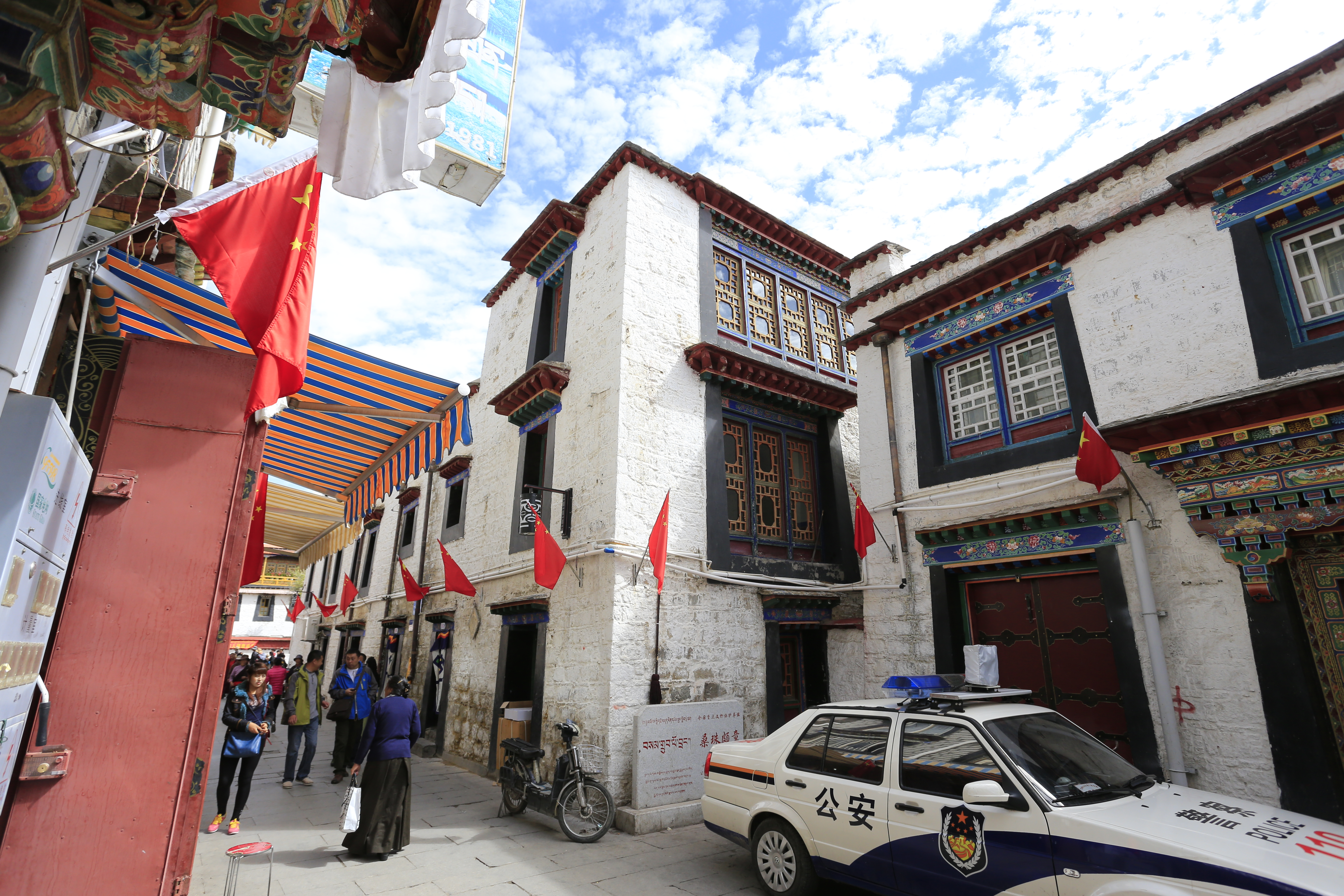
Samdrup Pohang in 2014

Samdrup Pohang or Samdrup Podrang, Samdrup Phodrang (Tibetan: བསམ་གྲུབ་ཕོ་བྲང་།, Wylie: bsam grub pho brang, Chinese: 桑珠颇章), located at the entry of the Jidu Lane, South Street, Barkhor, Chengguan District, Lhasa, Tibet Autonomous Region, is an ancient architectural compound, which is now a private residence.

== History ==
Sangzhu Pohang sitting north to south, is the 1642-built mansion for Khoshut leader Güshi Khan. In 1642, Güshi Khan attacked Tibet and established Ganden Phodrang, which ruled Tibet for about 80 years. In 1653, Güshi Khan accepted the title by Shunzhi Emperor, and in the next year, died of illness in Drepung Monastery in Lhasa. After his death, the rule of the Khoshut in Tibet gradually weakened. Later, Samdrup Pohang was owned by the Seventh Dalai Lama's father, Solang Daji (Sonomu Darza).

In 1729, Emperor Yongzheng received Solang Daji in Beijing and made him a duke. Soon, a large area of land in the Shannan region of Tibet and Sangzhu Puchang also belonged to Solang Daji. Solang Daji died, the seventh Dalai brother Gongge Danjin was titled by the Qianlong emperor as a duke. This Samdrup Pohang family became one of the four great families in Tibet.

Around the 1980s, Samdrup Pohang was occupied by the "Tibet Agricultural Machinery Company", which sold pesticides, seeds, and agricultural machinery. Later, it became a residential and commercial building, and around 2012, it was repaired.
