= Tenzin Wangchuk Khan =

Wangchuk Khan Ванжил Хаан དབང་ཕྱུག་ཧན
- Khan; Protector-ruler of Tibet

4th khan of the Khoshut Khanate
- Reign: 1696-1697
- Predecessor: Tenzin Dalai Khan
- Successor: Lhazang Khan
- Born: Wanggyal (Ванжил, དབང་རྒྱལ)
- Died: 1697 or 1703; Ü-Tsang, Tibet
Regnal name
- Vanjil Khan (Ванжил Хаан); Tenzin Wangchuk Khan (བསྟན་འཛིན་དབང་ཕྱུག་ཧན)
- House: Borjigin
- Dynasty: Khoshut Khanate
- Father: Tenzin Dalai Khan

Tenzin Wangchuk Khan (Mongolian: Ванжил Хаан, died 1697 or 1703) was the fourth khan of the Khoshut Khanate and protector-king ("Dharma king, Protector of the Faith") of Tibet. He reigned from 1696 to 1697, or from 1701 to 1703, during the age of the 6th Dalai Lama, Tsangyang Gyatso.

Tenzin Wangchuk Khan, also known as Wanggyal, was the elder son of the previous ruler Tenzin Dalai Khan. He succeeded his father at an uncertain date, either 1696 or 1701. Towards the end of his father's life he had a serious disagreement with his younger brother Lhazang Khan which the envoys of the Dalai Lama regime were not able to bridge. This proved fatal when their father had died. After a brief reign Tenzin Wangchuk was poisoned by Lhazang Khan who then took the throne. This happened in either 1697 or 1703. According to a new investigation of the documents, by Peter Schwieger, Tenzin Wangchuk did not actually accede to the throne due to his poor health. Rather, the Sixth Dalai Lama proposed the younger brother Lhazang as successor in 1703. The latter was enthroned, and Tenzin Wangchuk died early the following year.

Preceded by Tenzin Dalai Khan	Khan of the Khoshut Khanate; Protector-ruler of Tibet; 1696–1697	Succeeded by Lhabzang Khan
