= 6th Dalai Lama =

Spiritual leader of Tibet from 1697 to 1706

6th Dalai Lama, Tsangyang Gyatso
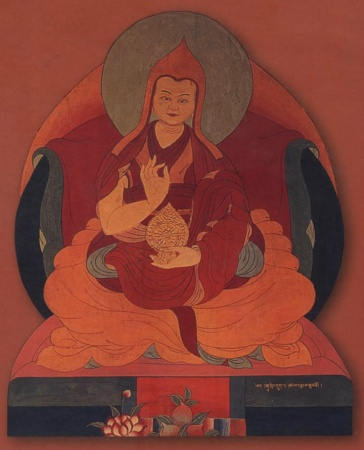
- Title: His Holiness the 6th Dalai Lama

Religious life
- Religion: Tibetan Buddhism

Senior posting
- Period in office: 1697 received full authorities
- Predecessor: 5th Dalai Lama, Ngawang Lobsang Gyatso
- Successor: 7th Dalai Lama, Kelzang Gyatso

Chinese name
- Chinese: 倉央嘉措
Transcriptions

Tibetan name
- Tibetan: ཚངས་དབྱངས་རྒྱ་མཚོ་
Transcriptions
- Wylie: tshangs dbyangs rgya mtsho
- Born: 1 March 1683; Tawang, Tibet (present-day Arunachal Pradesh, India)
- Disappeared: 1706 (aged 22–23); Tso Ngonpo, Qing dynasty (present-day Qinghai province, China)
- Status: Assumed dead. Some legends claim that he reportedly survived the kidnapping by Lhazang Khan and the Qing transport but was entirely unverifiable.

The 6th Dalai Lama, Tsangyang Gyatso (Tibetan: ཚངས་དབྱངས་རྒྱ་མཚོ, Wylie: tshangs-dbyangs rgya-mtsho) (1 March 1683 – after 1706) was recognized as the 6th Dalai Lama after a delay of many years, permitting the Potala Palace to be completed. He was an unconventional Dalai Lama that preferred a Nyingma school yogi's life to that of an ordained monk. He was later kidnapped and deposed by the Koshut Lhazang Khan.

The death of the 5th Dalai Lama remained concealed for many years by his Kalon, in order to complete the building of the Potala Palace. The 6th Dalai Lama was born in southern Tibet, known as "Monyul", (Note: Nanda 2020, p. 30: "Tawang, Dirang and parts of Western Kameng of Arunachal Pradesh, were historically and territorially (traditionally) part of the 'Monyul'.") at Urgelling Monastery, which is in modern-day Tawang district, Arunachal Pradesh, India. He was officially located at the age of either 13 or 14.

As a youth, he showed high levels of intelligence with unconventional views. Later and while living as a lay practitioner and a yogi, he grew his hair long, dressed as a regular Tibetan, and was said to also drink alcohol and openly accept women as companions. He was said to be a popular Dalai Lama in Lhasa's Shol neighborhood located at the base of the Potala.

During a power struggle between Mongolians and Qing China in Tibet and Lhasa, the Dalai Lama's Kalon (regent) was killed by the Koshut Lhazang Khan. The 6th Dalai Lama was kidnapped and deposed by Mongolian forces. He disappeared and was either killed or somehow escaped and survived.

The 6th Dalai Lama is also well known for his poems and songs that continue to be popular not only in modern-day Tibet but also among Tibetan speaking communities in Nepal, India and all across China.

== Early life ==
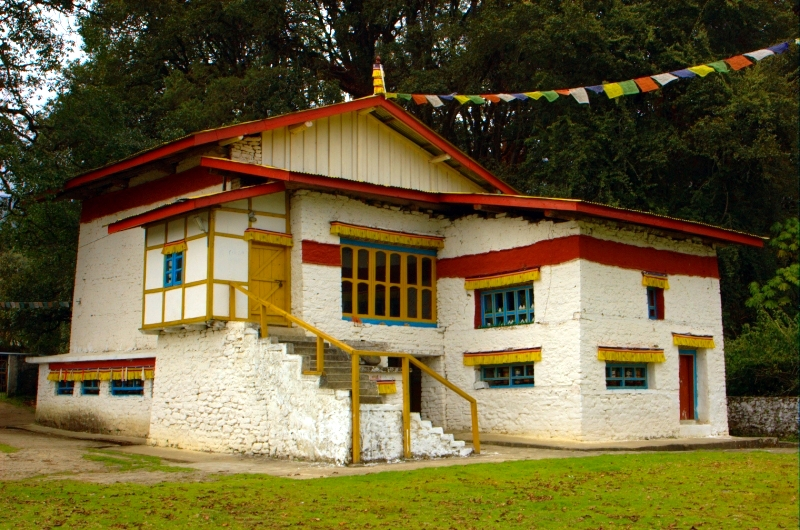
Birthplace of 6th Dalai Lama, Urgelling Monastery, Tawang Town, A.P., India

Tsangyang Gyatso was born on 1 March 1683 in Mon Tawang (presently in modern Arunachal Pradesh, India). His father was Lama Tashi Tenzin of Urgelling, a descendant of the treasure revealer Pema Lingpa, and his mother was Tsewang Lhamo, a Monpa woman from a royal family of Bekhar Village.

The Dalai Lama was therefore a Monpa by ethnicity, born in "Monyul" at Urgelling Monastery, near Tawang and Tawang Monastery in the northwestern part of present-day Arunachal Pradesh, India.

There were special occurrences surrounding the birth, life and death of Tsangyang Gyatso. His mother, Tsewang, had experienced a few miracles prior to the birth of Tsangyang Gyatso. One day, within the first month of her pregnancy, she was husking paddy in the stone mortar. To her surprise, water started accumulating in the mortar. On another occasion, when Tsewang drank water at a nearby place, milk started gushing out in place of water. Since then, this stream was known as Oma-Tsikang, literally translating to milky water.

In the course of time, Tsewang gave birth to a boy who was named Sanje Tenzin, with Tsangyang's grandfather and Nawang Norbu with his father. Due to this fact, legend said that he would not drink his mother's milk from the day after their birth. One day, when his face began to swell from an infection and Tsangyang could hardly open his eye, two local diviners were summoned. They prescribed purifactory rite and said that his name should be changed to Ngawang Gyatso.

His recovery was credited by the regent to the intervention of the Dalai Lama's own guardian deity, Dorje Dakpa. The grandfather dreamt that the child was constantly being protected by heavenly beings. The mother dreamt, as she took a rest from her weaving, that a great company had arrived to take him off. His paternal grandmother dreamt of two suns shining in the sky.

== Historical background ==
Although the 5th Dalai Lama had died in 1682, the Regent Desi Sangye Gyatso (Wylie: sangs rgyas rgya mtsho) kept his death a secret – partly to continue the stable administration, and partly to gain time for the completion of the Potala Palace. The monks concentrated their search to the region of Tibet to find the next incarnation, but later came to conclude that 6th Dalai Lama was born outside the Tibetan territory in a valley whose name ended with "ling". They searched all places ending with "ling", including three in Tawang – Urgyanling, Sangeling and Tsorgeling.

The Potala authorities took the Dalai Lama from his mother in 1697 from Urgyanling. The journey to Pota Lhasa from Tawang was 7 days, and they spend first night in Tsona (near Cuona Lake, China) where he slept with girls. Responding to the strict rules of the Tibetans, he constantly opposed laws which overruled him, and eventually became a drunk. After arriving to Tibet, Sangye Gyatso sent a delegation to the Kangxi Emperor of Qing China in 1697 to announce that the 5th Dalai Lama had died and the 6th had been discovered.

The regent invited Lobsang Yeshe, 5th Panchen Lama to administer the vows of a śrāmaṇera (novice monk) on the young man at Nankartse and named him Tsang Gyatso. On 8 December 1697, Tsangyang Gyatso was enthroned as the 6th Dalai Lama.

In 1705 Lhazang Khan, a Mongol king, had the Regent, Sangye Gyatso, killed. This greatly upset the young Dalai Lama, who left his studies and even visited the 5th Panchen Lama in Shigatse to renounce his śrāmaṇera vows.

== Life as a Dalai Lama ==
As a Dalai Lama, Tsangyang had composed excellent works of songs and poems, but often went against the principles of the Gelug School of Tibetan Buddhism. For example, he decided to give getsul vows to Lobsang Yeshe, 5th Panchen Lama at eighteen instead of taking the full gelong vows normal for his age.

The Panchen Lama, who was the abbot of Tashilhunpo Monastery, and Prince Lhazang, the younger brother of the Po Gyalpo Wangyal, persuaded him not to do so.

Tsangyang Gyatso enjoyed a lifestyle that included drinking, the company of women, and writing love songs. He visited the 5th Panchen Lama in Shigatse and, requesting his forgiveness, renounced the vows of a novice monk. He ordered the building of the Tromzikhang palace in Barkhor, Lhasa.

Tsangyang Gyatso had always rejected life as a monk, although this did not mean the abdication of his position as the Dalai Lama. Wearing the clothes of a normal layman and preferring to walk than to ride a horse or use the state palanquin, Tsangyang only kept the temporal prerogatives of the Dalai Lama. He also visited the parks and spent nights in the streets of Lhasa, drinking wine, singing songs and having amorous relations with girls. Tsangyang retreated to live in a tent in the park near the northern escarpment of Potala Palace. Tsangyang finally gave up his discourses in public parks and places in 1702, which he had been required to do as part of his training.

== Capture and disappearance ==
Using the Dalai Lama's behaviour as an excuse and with the approval of his ally China's Kangxi Emperor, Lhazang Khan, khan of the Khoshut, killed the regent and kidnapped the Sixth Dalai Lama. On 28 June 1706, Lhazang Khan deposed Tsangyang; he later installed a 21-year-old lama, Ngawang Yeshey Gyatso, as the "true" 6th Dalai Lama in 1707, claiming that he, not Tsangyang, was the true rebirth of the 5th Dalai Lama. The Gelugpa dignitaries and the Tibetan people rejected Lhazang Khan's installation of Ngawang Yeshey Gyatso and continued to recognise Tsangyang's title. However, Ngawang Yeshey Gyatso is considered by Tibetans to have been an incarnation of Avalokiteśvara.

While being taken out of Tibet, Tsangyang composed a poem which some say foretold of his next birth. "White crane lend me your wings. I will not fly far. From Lithang I shall return." (Note: བྱ་དེ་ཁྲུང་ཁྲུང་དཀར་པོ།། ང་ལ་གཤོག་རྩལ་གཡར་དང་།། ཐག་རིང་རྒྱང་ནས་མི་འགྲོ།། ལི་ཐང་བསྐོར་ནས་སླེབས་ཡོང་།།) Tsangyang disappeared mysteriously on 15 November 1706, which is why there is no tomb for him in the Potala Palace. It has been said that he was killed on the way to China. Other rumours persisted he had escaped and lived in secrecy somewhere between Tibet and Mongolia. A work from 1757 alleges the Dalai Lama survived and was welcomed in Amdo by a group of mostly Kagyu monasteries.

The Tibetans appealed to the Dzungar people, who invaded Tibet and killed Lhazang Khan in late 1717. Tsangyang was succeeded by Kelsang Gyatso, who was born in Lithang, as the 7th Dalai Lama.

== Legacy ==
In September 2024, a team of 15 members climbed an uncharted peak in Tawang district, which was later named after Tsangyang Gyatso. The Defence Ministry of India named the peak after him to pay tribute to his "timeless wisdom and huge contributions" to the local Monpa population.

== Notes ==
Buddhist titles
Preceded by Ngawang Lobsang Gyatso	Dalai Lama; 1697–1706; Recognized in 1688	Succeeded by Kelzang Gyatso
