= Dayan Khan (Khoshut) =

Dayan Khan Даян Хаан ད་ཡན་ཧན
- Khan; Protector-ruler of Tibet

2nd khan of the Khoshut Khanate
- Reign: 1655-1668
- Predecessor: Güshi Khan
- Successor: Gonchig Dalai Khan
- Born: Tenzin Dorje (Данзандорж, བསྟན་འཛིན་རྡོ་རྗེ)
- Died: 22 April 1668; Ü-Tsang, Tibet
Names
- Dayan Ochir Khan(ᠲᠠᠶᠠᠨ ᠸᠴᠢᠷ ᠬᠠᠭᠠᠨ; Даян Очир хаан)
Regnal name
- Dayan Ochir Khan (Даян Очир Хаан); Tenzin Dayan Khan (བསྟན་འཛིན་ད་ཡན་ཧན)
- House: Borjigin
- Dynasty: Khoshut Khanate
- Father: Güshi Khan

Dayan Khan (Mongolian: ᠳᠠᠶᠠᠨ ᠬᠠᠭᠠᠨ dayan qaɣan, died 22 April 1668) was the second khan of the Khoshut Khanate and protector-king of Tibet, ruling from 1655 to 1668. He sat on the throne during the time of the 5th Dalai Lama, Ngawang Lobsang Gyatso, but did not have a major independent role in Tibetan politics.

== Khoshut patronage ==
Dayan Khan was the son of Güshi Khan of the Khoshut tribe who allied with the Gelug faction (the Yellow Church) in Tibet and was victorious in 1642. Güshi had offered the earth, tribes and people of the three cholka of Tibet to the Gelug leader, the 5th Dalai Lama. The Dalai Lama, in return, named him Dharma king, Protector of the Faith. The Khoshut khan did not normally interfere in political matters, but rather managed the Mongol forces that backed up the dharma regime of Dalai Lama. Güshi Khan and his sons were known as "the father and son kings of the Mongolian government".

== Reign ==
As long as Güshi was alive he maintained a degree of control over the new Tibetan state. However, he died in January 1655, 73 years old. His eldest and youngest sons, Dayan Khan and Tashi Batur (1632–1714), then reigned in tandem. However, they stood far below their imposing father in terms of political wisdom or prestige. They were suspicious of each other and primarily focused on Mongolian affairs. Dayan, who was also known as Tenzin Dorje or Tsik Shitu Tenzin, was the eldest son of the younger queen of Güshi. He was proclaimed the new "king of Tibet" by the Dalai Lama on 7 February 1658 and took responsibility for the Mongol troops like his father had done. A division of the Khoshuts was effected so that his junior brother Tashi Batur ruled in the Kokonor region, while Dayan Khan held power over the tribesmen in Central Tibet and maintained his prerogatives as Dharma king. There was however commotion among the Mongols who lived by the Tsongön Lake in this period, as the factions did want to submit to each other. The 5th Dalai Lama dispatched envoys who made the Mongols promise to conform to Buddhist principles and end their discord. The situation indicates the degree of Dalai Lama's spiritual and political influence. Clearly, Dayan Khan did not have the pondus of his father. The Khoshut elite was handicapped by its nomadic lifestyle, having their main pastures in the land of Dam (south-east of Tengri-Nor Lake). The king would only come to Lhasa in the winters, though not every year, and stay at the Ganden Khangsar Palace. An incident with the Qing Empire occurred towards the end of Dayan's reign, in 1667. An army of Mongols from Kokonor moved towards Xining near the border and laid siege to the city. However, they withdrew on the approach of Chinese troops. Dayan died on 22 April 1668 and was succeeded in his dignity by his son Tenzin Dalai Khan.

== See also ==
- History of Tibet

== Footnotes ==
| Preceded by Güshi Khan | Khan of the Khoshut Khanate; Protector-ruler of Tibet; 1655–1668 | Succeeded by Tenzin Dalai Khan |
