= Lha-bzang Khan =

Mongol Khoshut ruler and king of Tibet

Lhab-zang Khan Лхавзан Хаан ལྷ་བཟང་ཧན
- Khan; Protector-ruler of Tibet
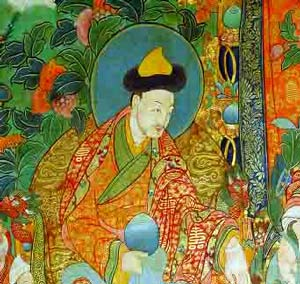

5th khan of the Khoshut Khanate
- Reign: 1697 or 1703-1717
- Predecessor: Tenzin Wangchuk Khan
- Born: Lhazang Lupel (ལྷ་བཟང་ཀླུ་དཔལ)
- Died: 1717; Lhasa, Ü-Tsang, Tibet
Regnal name
- Lhazang Khan (Лхазан Хаан, ལྷ་བཟང་ཧན)
- House: Borjigin
- Dynasty: Khoshut Khanate
- Father: Tenzin Dalai Khan

Lha-bzang Khan (Mongolian: ᠯᠠᠽᠠᠩ ᠬᠠᠭᠠᠨ Lazang Khaan; Tibetan: ལྷ་བཟང༌, ZWPY: Lhasang; alternatively, Lhazang or Lapsangn or Lajang; d.1717) was the ruler of the Khoshut (also spelled Qoshot, Qośot, or Qosot) tribe of the Oirats. He was the son of Tenzin Dalai Khan (1668–1701) and grandson (or great-grandson) of Güshi Khan, being the last khan of the Khoshut Khanate and Oirat King of Tibet. He acquired effective power as ruler of Tibet by eliminating the regent (desi) Sangye Gyatso and the Sixth Dalai Lama, Tsangyang Gyatso, but his rule was cut short by an invasion by another group of Oirats, the Dzungar people. At length, this led to the direct involvement of the Chinese Qing dynasty in the Tibetan politics.

== Rise to power ==
Since the Khoshut invasion of Central Tibet in 1641–42, Tibet had been governed through a tripartite division of power. While the Dalai Lama was the supreme spiritual ruler, the Khoshut khan controlled the armed forces and carried the title of "Dharma king, Protector of the Faith". Executive power was delegated to a regent or desi who was originally a formal appointee of the Khoshut king. After 1655 the Khoshut kings were, however, rather weak figures who enabled the Fifth Dalai Lama to wield great personal influence. His death in 1682 was kept secret until 1697, and the desi Sangye Gyatso, rumoured to be a son of the Dalai Lama, governed Tibet. He entertained close contacts with Galdan Boshugtu Khan, the ruler of the emerging Dzungar Khanate of Inner Asia, with the aim of countering the role of the Khoshuts in Tibetan affairs. It was only in 1697 that the Sixth Dalai Lama was installed, to the great irritation of the Qing Kangxi Emperor who had been kept in the dark about the matter, and furthermore was an enemy of the Dzungar rulers. It was in this situation that Lhazang Khan came to power. According to the usual version of the events, Lhazang succeeded as Dharma king by poisoning his brother Vangjal (Tenzin Wangchuk Khan), who ruled in 1696-1697 or, more probably, in 1701–1703. According to an alternative study, he was peacefully enthroned on the recommendations of the Sixth Dalai Lama, since his brother was sickly. Before his enthronement he had lived his life in the nomadic area at the Kokonor Lake, and never visited Lhasa until 1701.

== The murder of the regent ==
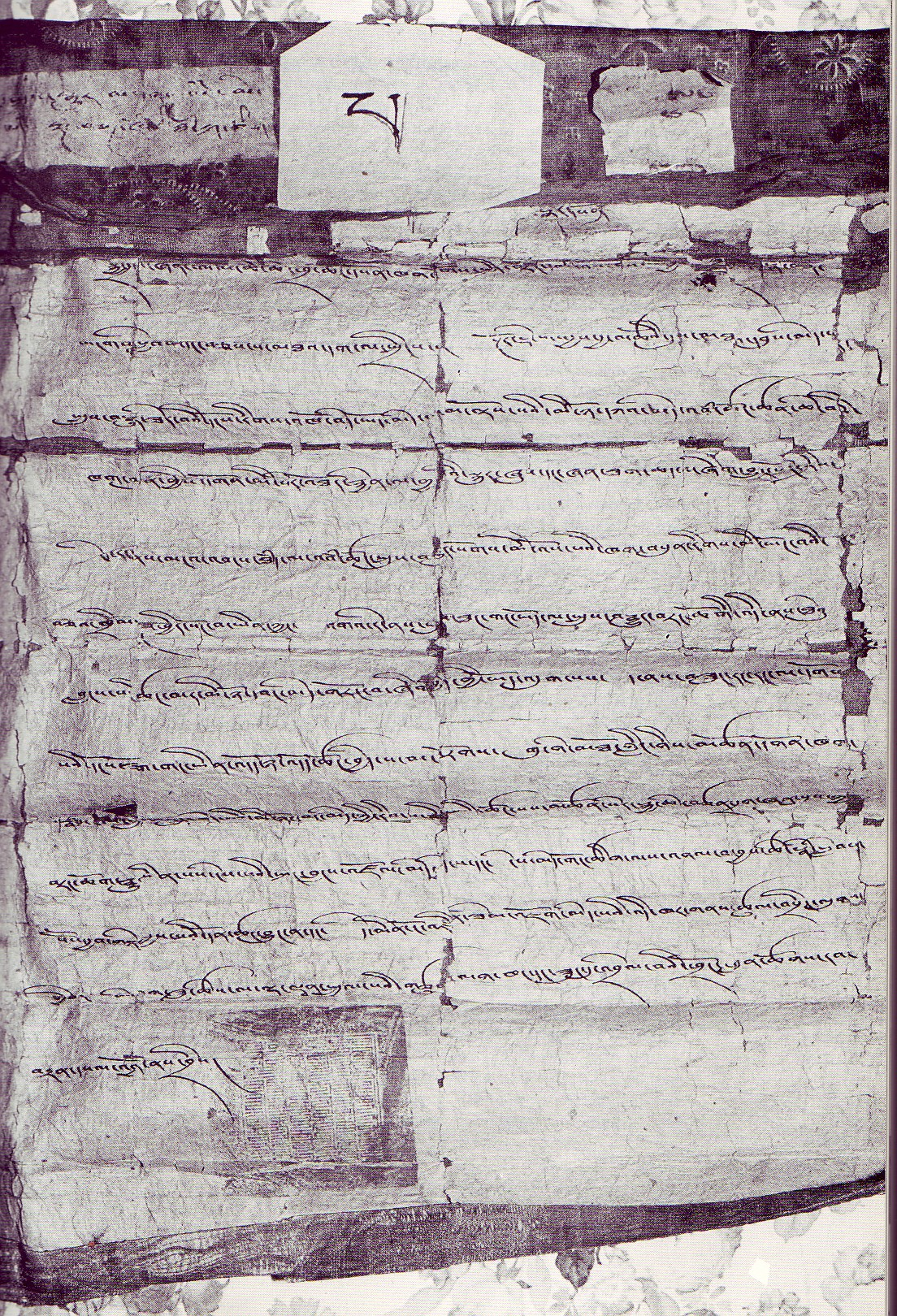
Legal Document of the Tibetan Ruler Lhabzang Khan. The seal is in Mongolian ouïghour script as Qoshots are Oirats.

The Sixth Dalai Lama turned out to be a talented but boisterous young man who preferred poetry-writing and the company of young women to monastic life. In 1702 he renounced his monastic vows and returned to lay status but retained his temporal authority. In the next year Sangye Gyatso formally turned over the regent title to his son Ngawang Rinchen, but in fact kept the executive powers. Now, a rift emerged within the Tibetan elite. Lhazang was a man of character and energy who was not content with the effaced state in which the Khoshut royal power had sunk since the death of Güshi Khan. He set about to change this, probably after an attempt by Sangye Gyatso to poison the king and his chief minister. Matters came to their head during the Monlam Prayer Festival in Lhasa in 1705, which followed the Tibetan New Year (Losar). During a grand meeting with the clergy, Sangye Gyatso proposed to seize and execute Lhazang Khan. This was opposed by the cleric Jamyang Zhepa from the Drepung Monastery, the personal guru of Lhazang. Rather, the Dharma king was strongly recommended to leave for Kokonor (Qinghai), the usual abode of the Khoshut elite. He pretended to comply and started his journey to the north. However, when he reached the banks of the Nagchu River (north-east of Central Tibet), he halted and began to gather the Khoshut tribesmen. In the summer of 1705 he marched on Lhasa and divided his troops in three columns, one under his wife Tsering Tashi. When Sangye Gyatso heard about this he gathered the troops of Central Tibet, Ngari and Kham close to Lhasa. He offered battle but was badly defeated with the loss of 400 men. The Panchen Lama Lobsang Yeshe tried to mediate. Realizing that his situation was hopeless, Sangye Gyatso gave up resistance on condition that he was spared and was sent to Gonggar Dzong west of Lhasa. However, the vengeful queen Tsering Tashi arrested the ex-desi and brought him to the Tölung Valley where he was killed, probably on 6 September 1705.

== Qing influences and the question of the Dalai Lama ==
With this feat Lhazang was acknowledged as king, gyalpo tripa. He also carried the courtesy title of Jingis Khan, and is usually known by that name among European visitors. His position was not entirely secure, and he resorted to some acts of violence; thus he killed the head of the Sera Ma College and flogged or imprisoned several persons in the Tsang region. Meanwhile, the Kangxi Emperor was eager to gain a degree of influence in Tibet, for the reason that the hostile Dzungar khans adhered to Tibetan Buddhism. If the Dzungar elite secured the support of the Dalai Lama it would affect the loyalty of the Mongols under Qing suzerainty. Lhazang Khan on his side looked for support with the Qing court and sent a report about the civil war of 1705 to the emperor, who approved his actions. As a reward for ridding him of his old enemy the desi, Kangxi appointed Lhazang Regent of Tibet (simplified Chinese: 翊法恭顺汗; traditional Chinese: 翊法恭順汗; pinyin: Yìfǎ gōngshùn Hàn; lit. 'Buddhism Respecting', 'Deferential Khan') . The emperor considered the Sixth Dalai Lama to be spurious and asked Lhazang to send him to Beijing. The king realized the possible reaction among the Tibetan population which still largely adhered to the libertine hierarch, but finally resolved to comply with the request. Accounts differ as to whether the king was sincerely offended by the Sixth's scandalous behavior, or he merely used it as an excuse. He summoned a clerical meeting and asked the lamas to disavow the Dalai Lama as an incarnation of Avalokiteshvara. The lamas, however, refused to agree and stated that Tsangyang Gyatso was the true Dalai Lama in spite of his shocking behaviour. They did, however issue a declaration that the spiritual enlightenment no longer dwelt in the young man.

== The dethronement of the Dalai Lama ==
Lhazang Khan now took action and brought out the Dalai Lama from the Potala Palace on 11 June 1706. Sixteen days later, he was declared deposed and was told of the emperor's order by the Chinese envoy. As he departed for Beijing, an angry crowd attacked the escort, freed the Dalai Lama and brought him to the Summer Palace at Drepung. The palace was soon surrounded by Khoshut troops and Dalai Lama let himself be taken to avoid a general massacre. Drepung was nevertheless stormed and sacked. The Dalai Lama was again sent towards the imperial court but died by the Kunga Nor Lake in Qinghai on 4 November. Rumours had it that he was murdered, but official accounts state that he died from illness. The king then found a monk from Kham, Ngawang Yeshe Gyatso, born in 1686, who was proclaimed the true reincarnation of the Fifth Dalai Lama (being a Seventh, according to Stein, or a new/real Sixth, according to Smith and Mullin). This person was in fact believed to be the son of Lhazang Khan himself. He was however enthroned without consulting with the religious authorities. Tibetans as well as Lhazang's Khoshut rivals strongly rejected the would-be Dalai Lama. Kangxi recognized Lhazang's choice, but hedged his bets considering the opposition from other Khoshuts and from the Tibetans. After some time a boy was discovered in Lithang in eastern Tibet who was believed to be the reincarnation of Tsangyang Gyatso. The boy, later known as Kelzang Gyatso was recognized by Güshi Khan's youngest son Tashi Batur (1632-1714) and another Khoshut prince called Amdowa. Kangxi showed interest for the boy although he did not recognize him yet. After 1715 he lived under imperial protection in Kumbum.

== The governance of Lhazang Khan ==
A major calamity struck the country in 1709. Tsang and Toh (West Tibet) suffered a severe earthquake which destroyed houses and killed many people. The central authorities sent relief to the afflicted areas, but this was insufficient and several towns had to be abandoned. In his foreign policy Lhazang had to cope with Chinese ambitions to turn his kingdom into a protectorate. The Manchu official Heshou was sent to Tibet in 1709 with the mission of supervising the king and watch against dissatisfied elements in society. Moreover, he collected geographical data used by European Jesuits in imperial service to draw accurate maps of the country. Nevertheless, the Qing commissioner was not supported by any Chinese troops, and was recalled in 1711. This left Lhazang Khan supreme in Tibet for the moment. A war with Bhutan broke out in 1714. Lhazang led the operations in person, invading Bhutan with three columns. However, he scored but limited success and soon withdrew the troops. The unsatisfactory result did not improve his standing in Tibet. The same may be said about his interest for the Catholic missionaries who visited Tibet in his reign, foremost among them Ippolito Desideri, whose anti-Buddhist rhetoric he sometimes seemed to endorse. In fact, Tibetan sources indicate that Lhazang was a pious Buddhist who had a good understanding of sutras and tantras. He built a new assembly hall at the Sera Monastery, moved the Urgé College that his ancestor Güshi Khan had established in Dam, and supported a new tantric college. He favoured the various monastic schools without discrimination, in particular the dominating Gelugpa school. In spite of such tokens of piety, the adverse attitude of the Buddhist clergy undermined his position.

== Dzungar invasion ==
According to one version, a number of clerics and officials, resentful of Lhazang Khan's grab of power, sent a letter to the court of the Dzungar Khanate in western Mongolia, asking the ruler Tsewang Rabtan to avenge the death of Sangye Gyatso. This is somewhat doubtful, since a contemporary source makes clear that Tsewang Rabtan did not like the murdered desi. More important were the strategical interests of the Dzungar elite. If they were able to conquer Tibet and place the boy Kelzang Gyatso on the throne of Lhasa, they might enlist the support of the Tibetans and Khoshuts in their enterprises against the Qing Empire. The parts of Mongolia under Manchu domination could then be attacked on two fronts, helped by the great authority of the Tibetan Buddhist institutions. In 1714, Lhazang anyway received a message from Tsewang Rabtan. There were many marital connections between the Khoshut and Dzungar princes, and Tsewang Rabtan was married to Lhazang's sister. Now the Dzungar lord proposed that his daughter may marry Lhazang's son Ganden Tenzin. Lhazang consented in spite of some doubts about Dzungar intentions. However, when Ganden Tenzin arrived to the Dzungar lands to pick up his bride, he was seized and kept prisoner by Tsewang Rabtan. After three years, in 1717, the Dzungar ruler appointed his brother Tsering Dondup to invade Tibet with an army of 7,000 cavalry, after having executed Ganden Tenzin. The horsemen did not take the usual route through the Kokonor region, but rather invaded via Yarkand and from there entered north-western Tibet. It was quite an astonishing feat which took the Khoshut regime by complete surprise.

== Death ==
Lhazang Khan was staying in the Dam region when he heard about the unexpected invasion. At this time he was an old man, overweight and a heavy drinker. His able officer Pholhane suggested the king guard the pass between Dam and Lhasa with musketeers, but Lhazang preferred to meet the enemy on the open plain. Meanwhile, Dzungar spies spread the word that they had come to avenge the death of Sangye Gyatso, return power over the country to the Tibetans themselves, and expel the "false" Dalai Lama Ngawang Yeshe Gyatso. This had effect. The troops of Lhazang were defeated and withdrew to Lhasa which was hastily put in a state of defence. The city was besieged by the Dzungars and eventually stormed on a dark night at the end of November. Treason helped the enterprise since ladders were dropped down the fortified walls. The king withdrew to the Potala after most of his loyal troops had been massacred. He then sent his other son Surya to fetch reinforcement in Kokonor, but the prince was captured by the invaders. Seeing that everything was lost, the king rode out from Potala in the night of 3 December 1717 with a handful of followers, desperately trying to escape. However, his horse was stuck in the mud and fell down. The fallen ruler engaged the pursuing enemy in fierce hand-to-hand combat. Eleven Dzungars fell by his hand before he was cut down. Meanwhile, a smaller Dzungar force of 300 attempted to retrieve Kelzang Gyatso from Kumbum, but was defeated by Kangxi's troops. The Dzungars, initially welcomed by the Tibetans amidst expectations that they would free them of Lhazang and enable the installation of Kelzang Gyatso, lost Tibetan goodwill quickly by looting Lhasa and persecuting the Nyingma.

Glenn Mullin portrays Lhazang Khan as a pious man who cultivated Tibetan religious authorities in every way possible, who was nevertheless rejected by the Tibetans because he was the first foreigner in almost 500 years to rule Lhasa. He is described as "a most liberal prince, very enlightened, and broad-minded in matters of religion, extremely fond of foreigners, and an administrator of rare wisdom."

Preceded by Tenzin Wangchuk Khan	Khan of the Khoshut Khanate; Protector-ruler of Tibet; 1697 or 1703–1717	Succeeded by Tagtsepa (Dzungar occupation)
