= Khoshut Khanate =

Oirat-Mongol kingdom in Tibet (1642-1717)

Khoshut Khanate ᠬᠣᠱᠣᠳ ᠬᠠᠨᠲᠣ ᠣᠯᠣᠰ
- 1642–1717
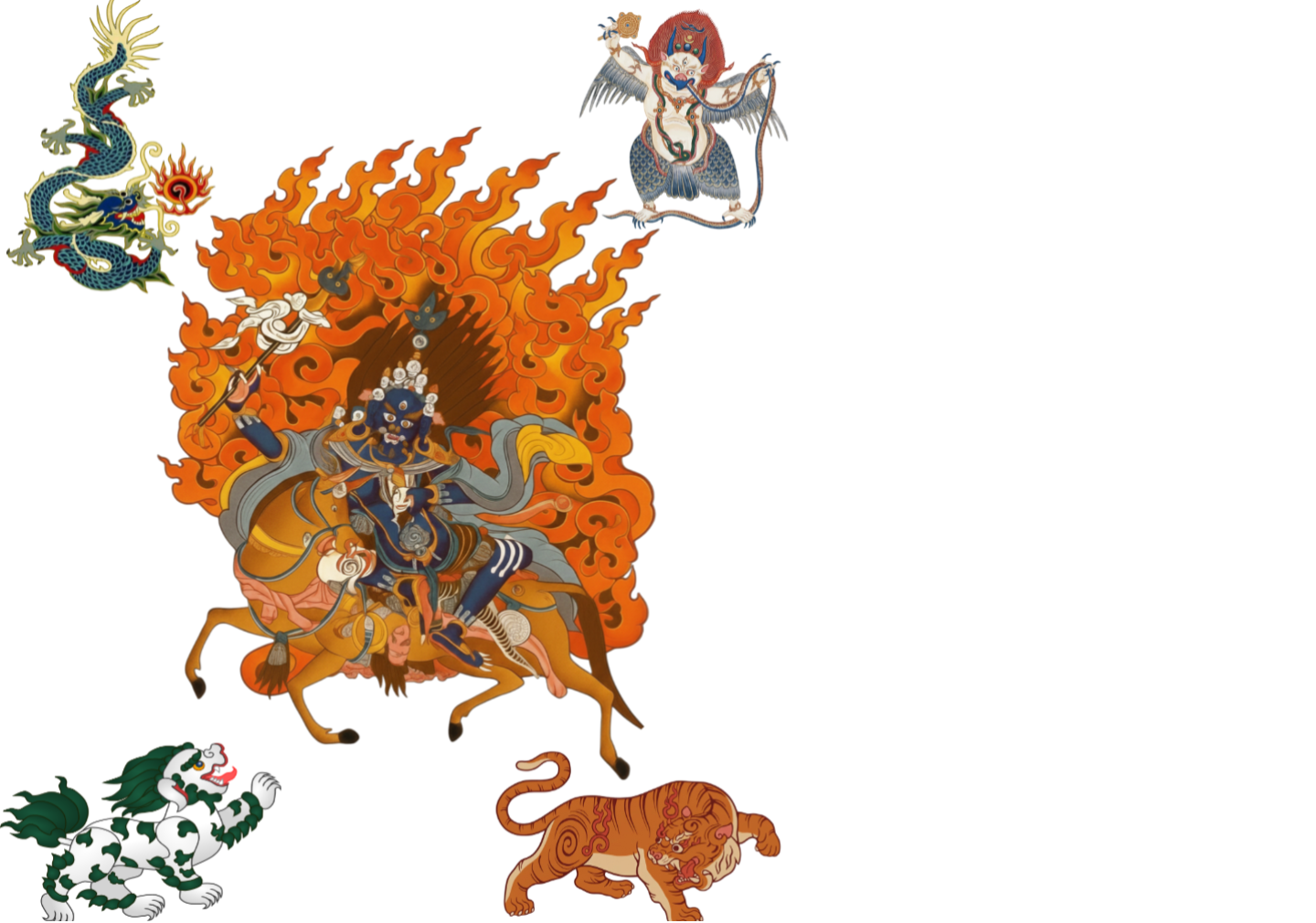
- Battle Standard Seal of Lha-bzang Khan

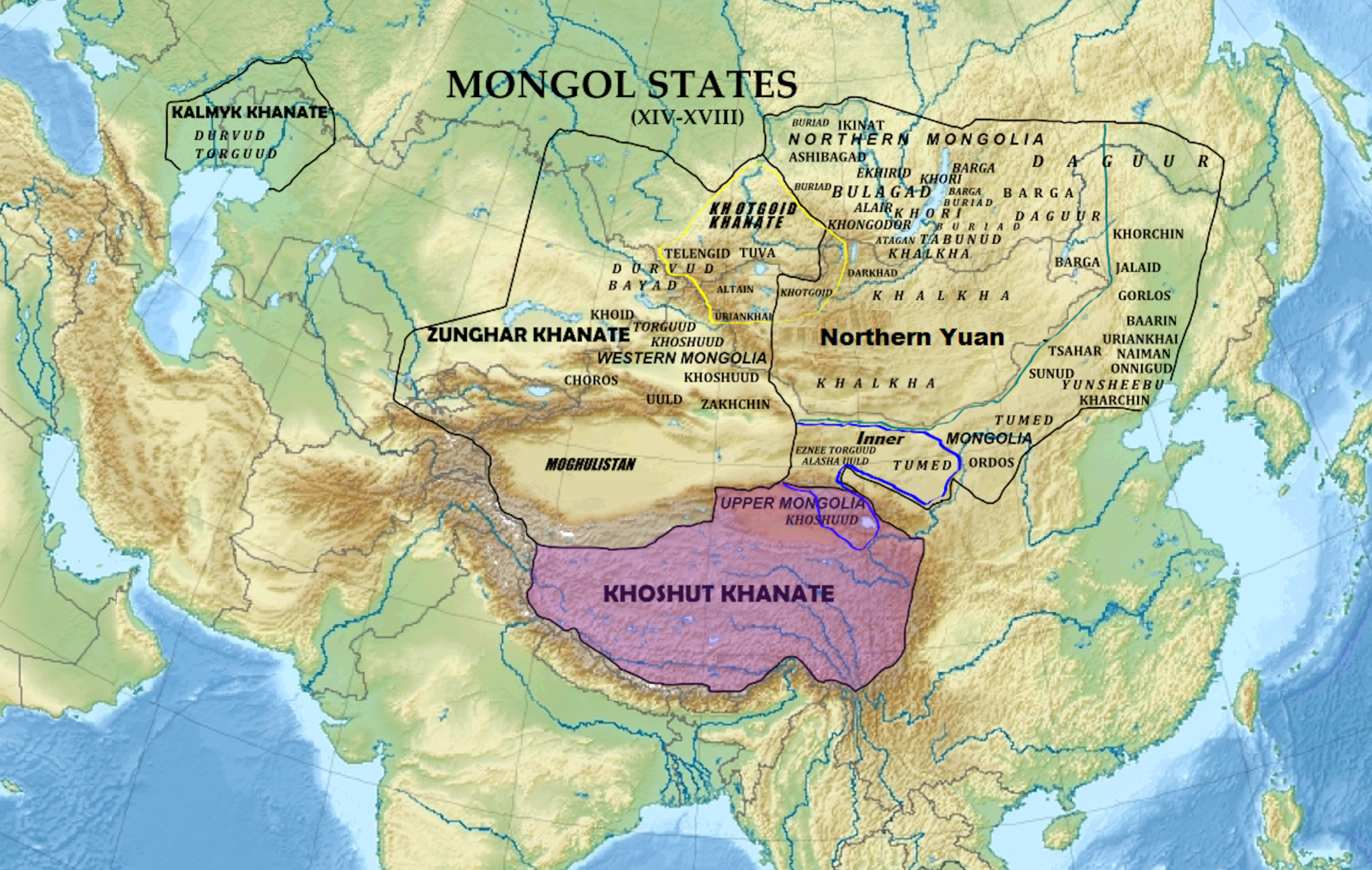
- Location of the Khoshut Khanate among Mongol tribes
- Status: Nominal vassals of the Qing dynasty
- Religion: Tibetan Buddhism
- Government: Nomadic empire
- History
  - Established: 1642
  - Disestablished: 1717
Preceded by	Succeeded by
Tsangpa	Dzungar Khanate
- Today part of: China

The Khoshut Khanate was a Mongol Oirat khanate based in the Tibetan Plateau from 1642 to 1717. Based in modern Qinghai, it was founded by Güshi Khan in 1642 after defeating the opponents of the Gelug school of Tibetan Buddhism in Tibet. The 5th Dalai Lama established a civil administration known as Ganden Phodrang with the aid of Güshi Khan. The role of the khanate in the affairs of Tibet has been subject to various interpretations. Some sources claim that the Khoshut did not interfere in Tibetan affairs and had a priest and patron relationship between the khan and Dalai Lama while others claim that Güshi appointed a minister, Sonam Rapten, as de facto administrator of civil affairs while the Dalai Lama was only responsible for religious matters. Güshi Khan accepted the nominal suzerainty of the Qing dynasty in 1654, when seal of authority and golden sheets were granted by the Shunzhi Emperor. In the last years of the khanate, Lhazang Khan murdered the Tibetan regent and deposed the 6th Dalai Lama in favor of a pretender Dalai Lama.

The Khoshut Khanate was ended in 1717 when the Dzungar prince Tseren Dondup invaded Tibet, killed Lhazang Khan, and installed the 7th Dalai Lama.

== History ==
=== Oirats ===
The Oirats were originally from the area of Tuva during the early 13th century. Their leader, Quduqa Bäki, submitted to Genghis Khan in 1208 and his house intermarried with all four branches of the Genghisid line. During the Toluid Civil War, the Four Oirat (Choros, Torghut, Dörbet, and Khoid) sided with Ariq Böke and therefore never accepted Kublaid rule. After the Yuan dynasty's collapse, the Oirats supported the Ariq Bökid Jorightu Khan Yesüder in seizing the Northern Yuan throne. The Oirats held sway over the Northern Yuan khans until the death of Esen Taishi in 1455, after which they migrated west due to Khalkha Mongol aggression. In 1486, the Oirats became embroiled in a succession dispute which gave Dayan Khan the opportunity to attack them. In the latter half of the 16th century, the Oirats lost more territory to the Tumed.

In 1620, the leaders of the Choros and Torghut Oirats, Khara Khula and Mergen Temene, attacked Ubashi Khong Tayiji, the first Altan Khan of the Khalkha. They were defeated and Khara Khula lost his wife and children to the enemy. An all out war between Ubashi Khong Tayiji and the Oirats lasted until 1623 when Ubashi Khong Tayiji was killed.

=== Güshi (1642-1655) ===
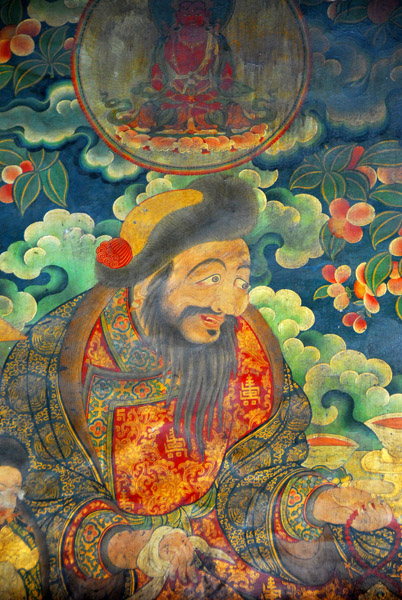
Güshi Khan, founder of the Khoshut Khanate

In 1625, a conflict erupted between the Oirat Khoshut Galwas chief Chöükür and his uterine brother Baibaghas over inheritance issues. Baibaghas was killed in the fight. However, his younger brothers Toro-Baikhu, later Güshi Khan, and Köndölön Ubashi took up the fight and pursued Chöükür from the Ishim River to the Tobol River, attacking and killing his tribal followers in 1630. Toro-Baikhu was the third of five sons born to Akhai Khatun and Khanai Noyan Khonggor. He had already become a distinguished fighter at the age of 12 and together with his brothers gained fame as part of "Akhai's herd of tigers" and "the five talented, brave heroic tigers" due to his military prowess. After Baibaghas' death, Toro-Baikhu married his brother's widow and adopted her son Ochirtu. Once he defeated all successor claimants, Toro-Baikhu styled himself "Dai Güshi" Taiji.

In 1632, the Gelug Yellow Hat sect in Qinghai (M. Kokonor/T. Tso Ngonpo) was being repressed by the Khalkha Choghtu Khong Tayiji, who aided their rivals the Karmapa and Bön sects. In 1634, the 5th Dalai Lama's envoys invited Güshi to come to their aid. The Oirats had already been supporters of the Gelug tradition since 1616 and Güshi used their religious affinity to gather an army for the expedition to Tibet. After a short visit to Tibet in 1635, the next year, Güshi led 10,000 Oirats in an invasion of Qinghai which resulted in the defeat of a 30,000 strong enemy army and the death of Choghtu. He then entered Central Tibet, where he received from the 5th Dalai Lama the title of Bstan-'dzin Choskyi Rgyal-po ("the Dharma King Who Upholds the Religion"). In 1637, the 5th Dalai Lama bestowed upon him the title of Dai Güshi Shajin Bariqchi Nomiyin Khan. Güshi thus became the first non-Genghisid Mongol to claim the title of khan. Güshi was also declared a reincarnation of Vajrapani, which in the eyes of Güshi's followers, established a priest and patron relationship that put him on the same level as the Dalai Lama and the Panchen Lama.

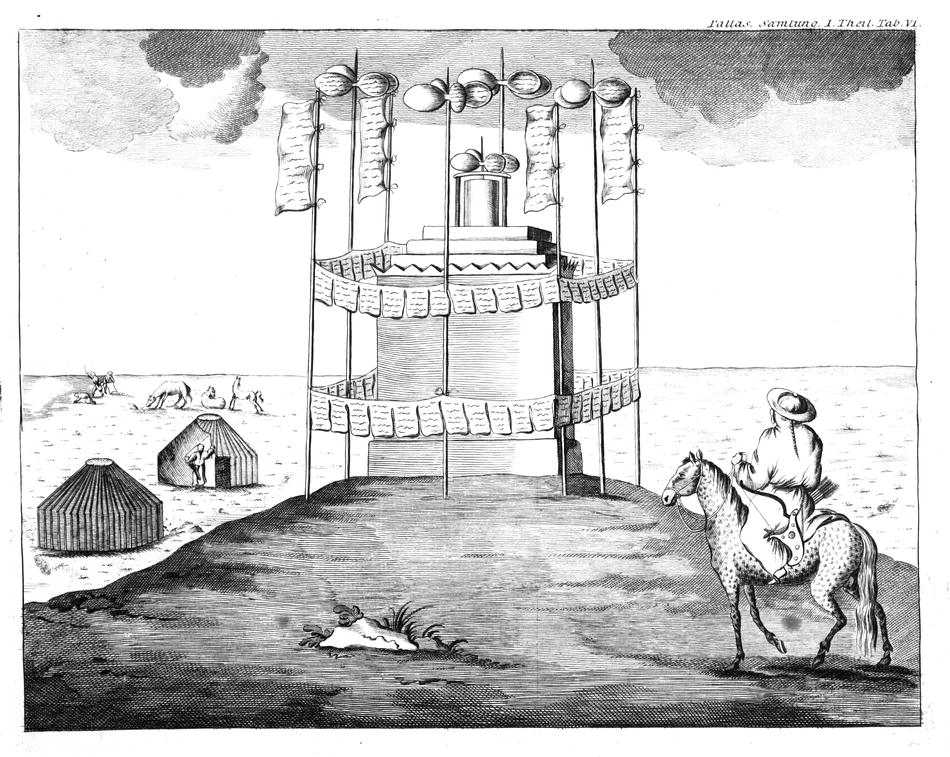
Funeral monument to a Khoshut prince.

He summoned the Oirats to conquer Tibet completely, initiating a mass migration of 100,000 Oirat households to Kokonor. This created the Khoshut Khanate. In the winter of 1640-1641, Güshi crushed the king of Beri, Donyo Dorje, and then the ruler of Tsangpa, Karma Tenkyong, in 1642. With the taking of Shigatse in 1642, Güshi had brought all of Tibet under the control of the Gelug school of Tibetan Buddhism and he was celebrated as the reincarnation of Padmasambhava, an 8th-century Indian Buddhist who built the first Buddhist monastery in Tibet. Among those involved in the campaign was Kharkhul's son, Erdeni Batur, who was granted the title of Khong Tayiji. He married the khan's daughter Amin Dara, and was sent back to establish the Dzungar Khanate on the upper Emil River south of the Tarbagatai Mountains. On 13 April 1642, the 5th Dalai Lama proclaimed Güshi the khan of Tibet. In Beijing, he was called the "khan of the Tibetans."

To ensure his authority over Tibet, Güshi instituted a government where the Dalai Lama was restricted to religious matters while a minister regent, Sonam Rapten, was directly appointed by Güshi to handle civil affairs. Güshi promoted the Gelug tradition as the guiding religion of his empire to cement his own authority. He allied with the Gelug hierarchs to create a system of legitimization based on the titles granted by the Dalai Lama. In 1653, Güshi's title as king of Ü-Tsang and Kham was formally justified as having been granted through merit and the mandate of heaven. This ensured that his title would be passed on to his successors as protectors and defenders of the Buddhist faith.

Upon his death in 1655, Güshi's son Tenzin Dorje, Dayan Khan, succeeded him as khan of Tibet. His sixth son Dalai Baatar was given control of Kokonor while Ochirtu was left in temporal power as Khan of the Oirats.

=== Ochirtu ===
Ochirtu Khan, a nephew of Güshi Khan, aided Sengge, the son and successor of Erdeni Batur in 1653 against his half brothers, resulting in Sengge's victory in 1661. Sengge was assassinated in 1670 by his half brothers Chechen Tayiji and Zotov Batur. Ochirtu aided Sengge's younger brother, Galdan Boshugtu Khan, in defeating Chechen and Zotov. Galdan married Ochirtu's granddaughter, Anu-Dara, but came into conflict with Ochirtu who feared his popularity. Ochirtu supported Galdan's rival uncle Choqur Ubashi. Ochirtu was defeated in 1677.

=== Lhazang (1703-1717) ===
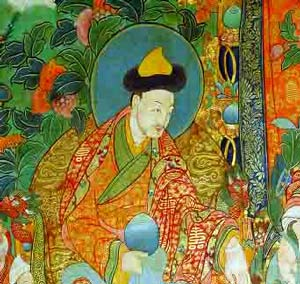
Lhazang Khan, the last Khoshut King of Tibet

There are different accounts of Lhazang Khan's rise to power. According to the first account, Lhazang Khan obtained power by poisoning his elder brother, Tenzin Wangchuk Khan, and after the regent Desi Sangye Gyatso tried to murder him, the regent himself was murdered on 6 September 1705. However according to a memorial dated 27 June 1703, the 6th Dalai Lama had informed the Khoshut that he intended to remove Sangye Gyatso as regent. Sangye Gyatso was replaced by his son. The 6th Dalai Lama proposed that Tenzin Wangchuk succeed his father, but Tenzin Wangchuk was sickly, and Lhazang became khan in 1703. Before his enthronement, Lhazang had only visited Lhasa once in 1701.

The regent tried to reduce the khan to a puppet and to control the 6th Dalai Lama. In 1703, the 6th Dalai Lama and his attendants were attacked by a group of people at night. One of the 6th Dalai Lama's favorite attendants was killed and he demanded the regent to find the murderers and punish them but the regent pretended to be unable to identify the murderers. Upon personal identification, the 6th Dalai Lama identified five people, all of whom had close relations to the regent. Lhazang was ordered to put these people to death, which he did, angering the regent.

According to a memorial dated 11 June 1704, the 6th Dalai Lama had a good relationship with the khan and joined him in hunting and practicing archery. The regent complained that he was but a figurehead. The regent tried to poison the khan, which may or may not have happened according to different accounts, but Lhazang survived. In 1705-6, Lhazang entered Lhasa, put the regent to death, and deposed the 6th Dalai Lama. According to Peter Schwieger, Lhazang sought the support of the Kangxi Emperor of the Qing dynasty, who requested that he send the 6th Dalai Lama to Beijing. However the Dalai Lama fell ill soon after leaving Lhasa and died on the way in Amdo on 14 November 1706.

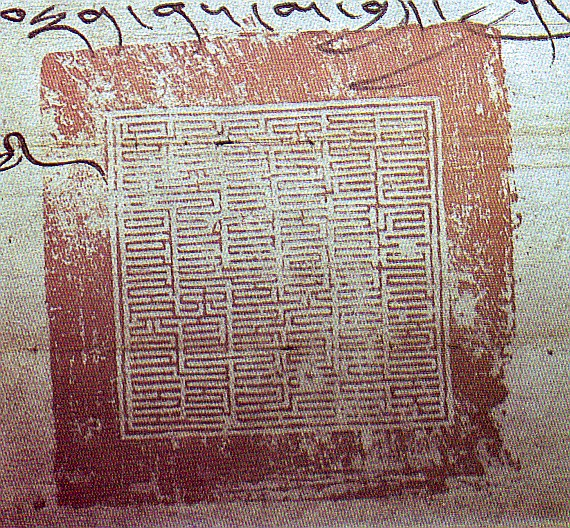
Seal of Lhazang Khan, the last Khoshut King of Tibet.

Lhazang presented a monk from Chagpori as the true reincarnation of the 5th Dalai Lama. In 1707, this monk was installed by the 5th Panchen Lama as Ngawang Yeshe Gyatso. For most followers of the Gelug school, this was an unauthorized action, and it also annoyed the Khoshut chiefs in Kokonor. On 10 April 1710, the Kangxi Emperor recognized the new Dalai Lama by granting him a title and seal. In Lithang in eastern Tibet, local lamas identified a child as the reincarnation of the 6th Dalai Lama. In 1712, the youngest son of Güshi Khan, Trashi Batur Taiji, and third son of Boshugtu Jinong, Cagan Danjin, declared their support for the boy. Lhazang's efforts to invalidate the Lithang reincarnation failed. The Khoshut chiefs asked the Kangxi Emperor to officially recognize the boy but the emperor left the matter undecided. Kangxi ordered the boy and his father to be interned in Kumbum Monastery in Kokonor in 1715.

During his reign, Lhazang abolished compulsory purchase and exchange of goods in Tibet to lessen the burden on people. Except for the 5th Panchen Lama, he was unable to win over the Gelugpa elite.

In 1717, the Dzungar prince Tseren Dondup invaded the Khoshut Khanate, deposed Yeshe Gyatso and installed the boy from Lithang as the 7th Dalai Lama, killed Lhazang Khan, and looted Lhasa. The Dzungars did not bring the boy to Lhasa and terrorized the populace, losing them the support of the Gelugpa. A Qing invasion in 1718 was annihilated by the Dzungars in the Battle of the Salween River, not far from Lhasa. A second and larger expedition expelled the Dzungars from Tibet in 1720. They brought the boy with them from Kumbum to Lhasa and installed him as the 7th Dalai Lama in 1721.

== Relationship with Tibet ==
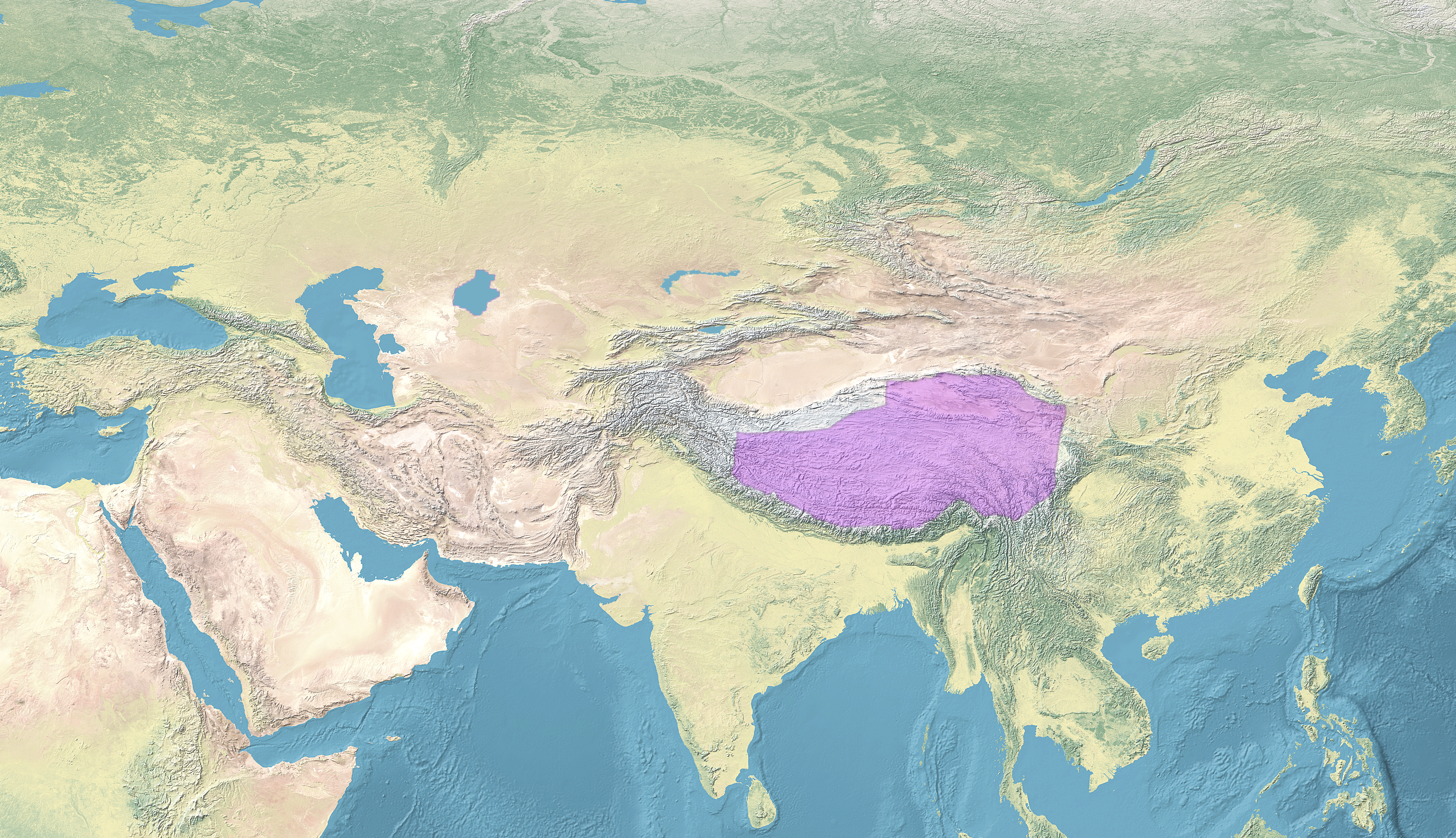
The Khoshut Khanate and contemporary Asian polities c. 1710

The Ganden Phodrang, named after the 5th Dalai Lama's residence in Drepung Monastery, was set up as a Gelug led government of Tibet in 1642. The Khoshut Khanate played a pivotal role in its founding by defeating the enemies of the Gelug school and part of the Ganden Phodrang's military defense continued to be handled by the Mongols after its establishment. There are various interpretations of the khan's role in the government. Some sources claim that the khan had little to do with the actual administration of Tibet and maintained only a priest and patron relationship with the Dalai Lama. According to Glenn Mullin, Güshi Khan was the appointee of three Mongol chieftains to represent their interests in Tibet and after having finished his business he returned to rule in Kokonor. René Grousset says that the Khoshut realm encompassed Kokonor and the Qaidam Basin while Tibet was a protectorate. Mullin points out that at the enthronement ceremony of the 5th Dalai Lama in 1642, Güshi sat on the same level as Sonam Rapten on a seat lower than the Dalai Lama. However Mullin also claims that until the death of Sonam Rapten in 1657, the 5th Dalai Lama was a figurehead while Sonam Rapten was the de facto ruler.

According to Luciano Petech, Güshi Khan indisputably granted the 5th Dalai Lama all temporal powers over Tibet in 1642, but the Dalai Lama did not possess the ability to undertake actual administration. The office of desi was created to carry out the government of the country and the Dalai Lama only decided the appeals of judicial decisions against the desi. A few years later, the 5th Dalai Lama asserted his temporal powers by appointing the desi, who only served short terms until the death of the 5th Dalai Lama. Petech says that besides military matters and foreign threats to Tibet, Güshi Khan and his successors did not interfere in the administration until the coup of 1705-6 when Lhazang Khan became de facto ruler of Tibet.

Other sources claim that the 5th Dalai Lama received authority from Güshi Khan to reign over Tibet but the khan had a hand in selecting the de facto administrator of civil affairs, the desi (governor) Sonam Rapten, while the 5th Dalai Lama was relegated to religious matters. FitzHerbert and Travers describe an increase in the 5th Dalai Lama's "day-to-day control of... his government" after the deaths of Sonam Rapten and Güshi Khan in the 1650s.

The key role of Güshi Khan in the rise of the Ganden Phodrang was celebrated by annual state ceremonies as late as the 20th century. During the Monlam Prayer Festival, people wore Mongol-style military clothing in the style of Güshi Khan's troops.

== Khoshut khans ==
- Güshi Khan: 1642–1655
- Dayan Khan: 1655–1668 (son)
- Tenzin Dalai Khan: 1668–1696 (son)
- Tenzin Wangchuk Khan: 1696–1697 (son)
- Lhazang Khan: 1697–1717 (brother)

== See also ==
- Mongol conquest of Tibet
- Qing conquest of Tibet
- List of rulers of Tibet
- Tibet–Ladakh–Mughal War

== Bibliography ==
- Adle, Chahryar (2003). History of Civilizations of Central Asia 5.
- Atwood, Christopher P. (2004), Encyclopedia of Mongolia and the Mongol Empire
- FitzHerbert, Solomon (2020), Introduction: The Ganden Phodrang's Military Institutions and Culture between the 17th and the 20th Centuries, at a Crossroads of Influences
- Haines, R Spencer (2018). "Charismatic Authority in Context: An Explanation of Guushi Khan's Swift Rise to Power in the Early 17th Century". Mongolica: An International Journal of Mongolian Studies. 52. International Association of Mongolists: 24–31.
- Mullin, Glenn H. (2001), The Fourteen Dalai Lamas: A Sacred Legacy of Reincarnation
- Petech, Luciano (2013), The Administration of Tibet During the First Half-Century of Chinese Protectorate
- Grousset, René (1970), The Empire of the Steppes
- Schwieger, Peter (2015), The Dalai Lama and the Emperor of China, Columbia University Press
- Spencer, Haines R. (2018), Charismatic Authority in Context: An Explanation of Guushi Khan's Swift Rise to Power in the Early 17th Century
- Stein, R. A. (1972), "Tibetan Civilization", The Geographical Journal, 138 (4): 501, Bibcode:1972GeogJ.138..501W, doi:10.2307/1795516, JSTOR 1795516
- Хойт С.К. Этническая история ойратских групп. Элиста, 2015. 199 с.
- Хойт С.К. Данные фольклора для изучения путей этногенеза ойратских групп // Международная научная конференция «Сетевое востоковедение: образование, наука, культура», 7–10 декабря 2017 г.: материалы. Элиста: Изд-во Калм. ун-та, 2017. с. 286–289.
