= Amdo =

Traditional region of Tibet

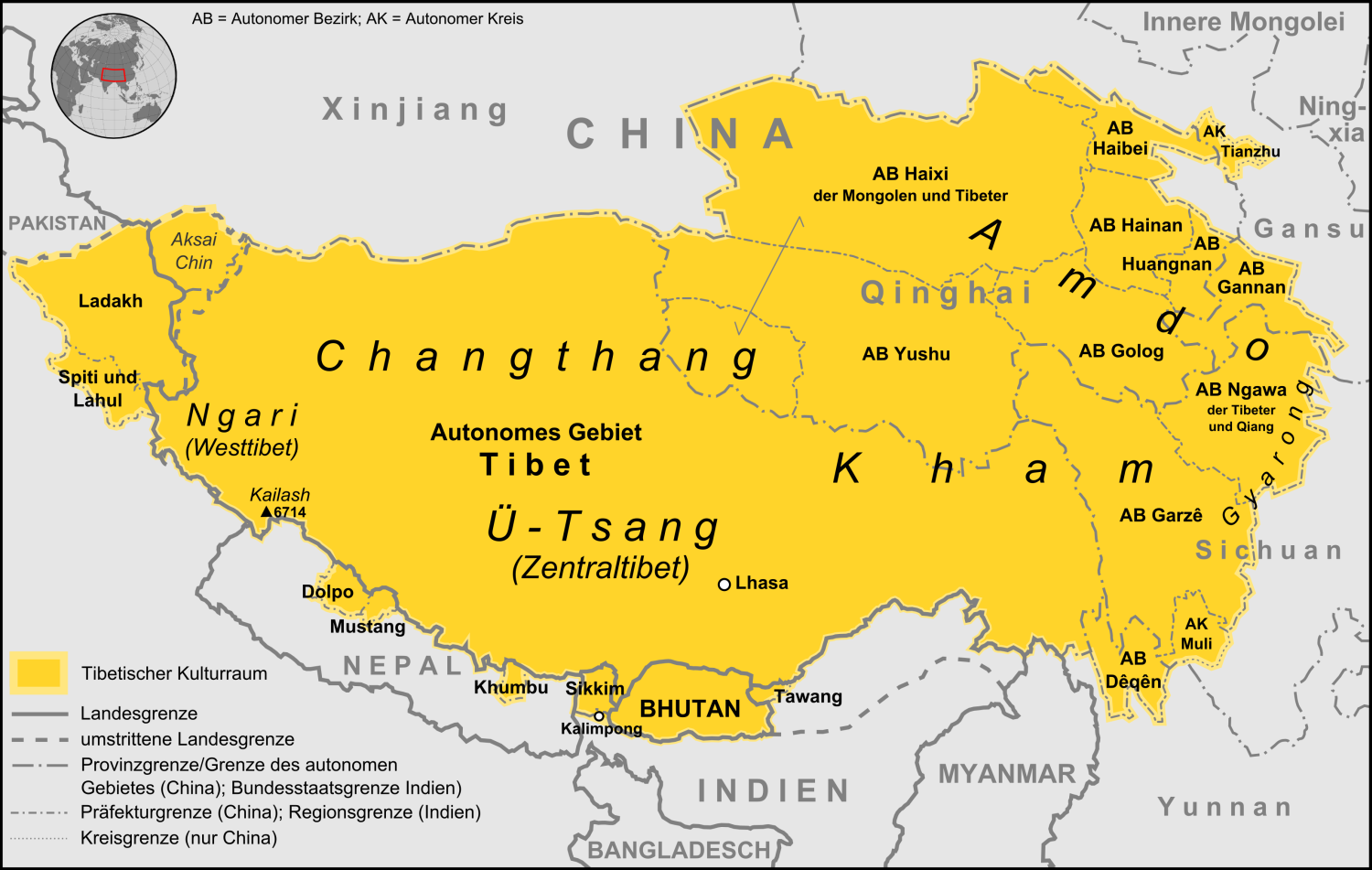
Amdo region of Tibet

Amdo (Tibetan: ཨ་མདོ་, Wylie: a mdo; Chinese: 安多; pinyin: Ānduō), also known as Domey (Tibetan: མདོ་སྨད་), is one of the three traditional Tibetan regions. It encompasses a large area from the Machu (Yellow River) to the Drichu (Yangtze). (Note: The identically-named, sparsely-populated Amdo County in the Tibet Autonomous Region (TAR) is not part of the historical Amdo province. It was directly administered by the Dalai Lama from Lhasa and is today a part of the Changtang region administered by Nagqu Prefecture in the northern part of the TAR.) Amdo is mostly coterminous with China's present-day Qinghai province, but also includes small portions of Sichuan and Gansu provinces.

In the 7th century, Amdo became a part of the Tibetan Empire until its dissolution in the 9th century. A local Tibetan theocracy called Tsongkha ruled the region from 997 to 1104. In the 13th century, Mongol forces conquered the area, which led to the beginning of a priest and patron relationship. From the 14th to the 16th century, the Ming Dynasty controlled some border areas of Amdo while Mongol presence remained significant. In the 1720s, the Yongzheng Emperor of Qing dynasty seized Amdo from the Dzungars and began forming the modern boundaries of Qinghai. He allowed most of the area to be administered by a series of local Tibetan rulers associated with the Ü-Tsang government through monastery systems but not directly governed by the Dalai Lama's Ganden Phodrang. From 1917 parts of Amdo were occupied by warlords of the Ma clique, who joined the Kuomintang (Chinese Nationalist Party) in 1928. By 1952, Chinese Communist Party forces had annexed central Tibet and defeated both Kuomintang and Tibetan forces, solidifying their hold on the area roughly by 1958.

Tibetans in Amdo traditionally engaged in agriculture and pastoralism. The region is the home of many Tibetan Buddhism spiritual leaders, such as the 14th Dalai Lama, the 10th Panchen Lama Choekyi Gyaltsen, and the great Gelug school reformer Je Tsongkhapa.

== Names ==
Amdo is one of the traditional regions of Greater or ethnographic Tibet. The other regions are Ü-Tsang, also known as political or central Tibet, to the southwest and Kham to the south. The name Amdo (Note: The "A" in the name presumably derives from how the name was pronounced in Amdo itself.) has become more common since the nineteenth century; older sources refer to roughly the same region as Domey. Amdo and Kham together were also called Do Kham on maps and manuscripts.

== Geography ==
Amdo encompasses the upper reaches of the Machu or Yellow River and Lake Qinghai. Its southern border is the Bayan Har Mountains. The area is wind-swept and tree-less, with much grass. Animals of the region consist of the wild yak and the kiang. Domesticated animals of the region consist of the domestic yak and dzo, goats, sheep, and the Mongolian horse. Amdo has been famous in epic story and in history as a land where splendid horses are raised and run wild.

== Demographics ==
=== Historical demographics ===
In historical times, the people of the region were typically non-Tibetan, such as the Mongols or the Hor people, although the latter were able to speak a Tibetan language. Other indigenous peoples included the Qiang, the Sumpa, and the Tuyuhun. People from Amdo and Kham have traditionally identified themselves as Amdowas and Khampas rather than Tibetans, sometimes more connected to the Chinese than they were to Ü-Tsang (Central Tibet).

=== Present demographics ===
The inhabitants of Amdo are referred to as Amdowa (Tibetan: ཨ་མདོ་པ།, Wylie: a mdo pa) as a distinction from the Tibetans of Kham (Khampa, Tibetan: ཁམས་པ།, Wylie: khams pa) and Ü-Tsang, however, they are all considered ethnically Tibetan.

Today, ethnic Tibetans predominate in the western and southern parts of Amdo, which are now administered as various Tibetan, Tibetan-Qiang, or Mongol-Tibetan autonomous prefectures. The Han Chinese are majority in the northern part (Haixi Mongol and Tibetan Autonomous Prefecture) and eastern part (Xining city and Haidong city) of Qinghai province. While Xining city and Haidong city are geographically small compared to the rest of Qinghai province, this area has the largest population density, with the result that the Han Chinese outnumber other ethnicities in Qinghai province generally.

The majority of Amdo Tibetans live in the larger part of Qinghai province, including the Mtshobyang (མཚོ་བྱང་།; Haibei in Chinese) Tibetan Autonomous Prefecture (TAP), Mtsholho (མཚོ་ལྷོ་།; Hainan) TAP, Rmalho (རྨ་ལྷོ་།; Huangnan) TAP, and Mgolog (མགོ་ལོག།; Guoluo) TAP, as well as in the Kanlho (ཀན་ལྷོ།; Gannan) TAP of the southwest Gansu province, and sections of the Rngaba (རྔ་བ།; Aba) Tibetan and Qiang Autonomous prefecture of north-west Sichuan province. Additionally, a great many Amdo Tibetans live within the Haidong (མཚོ་ཤར།; Wylie: mtsho shar) city of Qinghai which is located to the east of the Qinghai Lake (མཚོ་སྔོན།, Wylie: mtsho sngon) and around Xining (ཟི་ལིང།; zi ling) city, but they constitute only a minority (ca. 8.5%) of the total population there and so the region did not attain TAP status. The vast Haixi (མཚོ་ནུབ།; mtsho nub) Mongolian and Tibetan Autonomous Prefecture, to the west of the Qinghai Lake, also has a minority Tibetan population (ca. 10%), and only those Tibetans in the eastern parts of this Prefecture are Amdo inhabitants.

Mongols too have been long-term settlers in Amdo, arriving first during the time of Genghis Khan, but particularly in a series of settlement waves during the Ming period. Over the centuries, most of the Amdo Mongols have become highly Tibetanised and, superficially at least, it is now difficult to discern their original non-Tibetan ethnicity.

== Language ==
There are many dialects of the Tibetan language spoken in Amdo due to the geographical isolation of many groups. Written Tibetan is the same throughout Tibetan-speaking regions and is based on Classical Tibetan.

Many non-Tibetans of the region are multilingual and can speak Amdo Tibetan, making it difficult to ascertain their ethnicity based on language alone.

== History ==
=== 3rd century ===
The Qiang people were early users of iron and stories abound of them in their iron breast-plates with iron swords.

=== 7th century ===
From the seventh through the ninth century, the Tibetan Empire expanded into Amdo. The Qiang, Sumpa, Tuyuhun, and other peoples of the region were gradually tibetanized. During this period, control of Amdo moved from Songtsen Gampo and his successors to the royal family's ministers, the Gar (Wylie: 'gar). These ministers had their positions inherited from their parents, similar to the emperor. King Tüsong tried to wrest control of this area from the ministers, unsuccessfully.

=== 9th century ===
In 821, a treaty established the borders between the Tibetan Empire and the Tang dynasty, while three stele were built – one at the border, one in Lhasa, and one in Chang'an. The Tibetan army settled within the eastern frontier.

After 838 when Tibet's King Langdarma killed his brother, the Tibetan Empire broke into independent principalities, while Do Kham (Amdo and Kham) maintained culturally and religiously Tibetan. Within Amdo, the historical independent polities of hereditary rulers and kingdoms remained, while Mongol and Chinese populations fluctuated among the indigenous peoples and Tibetans. During this time period, Buddhist monks from Central Tibet exiled to the Amdo region.

There is a historical account of an official from the 9th century sent to collect taxes to Amdo. Instead, he acquires a fief. He then tells of the 10 virtues of the land. Two of the virtues are in the grass, one for meadows near home, one for distant pastures. Two virtues in soil, one to build houses and one for good fields. Two virtues are in the water, one for drinking and one for irrigation. There are two in the stone, one for building and one for milling. The timber has two virtues, one for building and one for firewood. The original inhabitants of the Amdo region were the forest-dwellers (nags-pa), the mountain-dwellers (ri-pa), the plains-dwellers (thang-pa), the grass-men (rtsa-mi), and the woodsmen (shing-mi). The grass men were famous for their horses.

=== 10th and 11th century ===
Gewasel is a monk that helped resurrect Tibetan Buddhism. He was taught as a child and showed amazing enthusiasm for the religion. When he was ordained he went in search of teachings. After obtaining the Vinaya, he was set to travel to Central Tibet, but for a drought. Instead he chose to travel in solitude to Amdo. Locals had heard of him and his solitude was not to be as he was sought after. In time he established a line of refugee monks in Amdo and with the wealth that he acquired he built temples and stupas also. The area was ruled by a Tibetan theocracy called Tsongkha from 997 to 1104. It was frequently drawn into conflicts with the Western Xia, formed by the Tangut people possibly of Qiang descent, as well as the Song, Liao, and Jin dynasties.

=== 13th century ===
The Mongols had conquered eastern Amdo by 1240 and would manage it under the Bureau of Buddhist and Tibetan Affairs, separately from the other territories administered by the Yuan dynasty. A priest and patron relationship began. Drogön Chögyal Phagpa, a Tibetan lama, visited Kublai Khan and became so popular that he was made Kublai's spiritual guide and later appointed by him to the rank of priest king of Tibet and constituted ruler of (1) Tibet Proper, comprising the thirteen states of Ü-Tsang; (2) Kham, and (3) Amdo, but kingdoms in Amdo and Kham remained largely independent of central Tibet. He spent his later years at Sakya Monastery in Ü-Tsang, which required that he travel through Amdo regularly. On one of these trips, he encountered armed resistance in Amdo and required escorts from Mongol Princes to travel through Amdo. While the concept of Tibet's Three Regions can be dated back to Tibetan Empire, Dunhuang manuscripts referring to the eastern parts of its territory as mdo-gams (Tibetan: མདོ་གམས) and mdo-smad (Tibetan: མདོ་སྨད), Yuan confirmed the division, and Do Kham as two well defined commanderies, along with Ü-Tsang, were collectively referred to as the three commanderies of Tibet since then. Tibet regained its independence from the Mongols before native Chinese overthrew the Yuan dynasty in 1368, although it avoided directly resisting the Yuan court until the latter's fall. By 1343, Mongol authority in Amdo had weakened considerably: Köden's fiefdom had been leaderless for some time, and the Tibetans were harassing the Mongols near Liangzhou (byang ngos). In 1347, a general rebellion erupted in some two hundred places in eastern Tibet, and though troops were sent to suppress them, by 1355 eastern Tibet was no longer mentioned in the dynastic history of the Mongols.

=== 14th to 16th century ===
Although the following Ming Dynasty nominally maintained the Mongol divisions of Tibet with some sub-division, its power is weaker and influenced Amdo mostly at their borders. The Mongols again seized political control in Amdo areas from the middle of the 16th century. However, the Ming Dynasty continued to retain control in Hezhou and Xining wei. As trade between Mongols, Tibetans, Muslim and Han Chinese deepened, a system of xiejia developed around Gansu. They initially served as lodgings for travelers but eventually assumed additional responsibilities, such as regulating commerce, collecting taxes, and settling legal disputes alongside the local yamens.

=== 17th century ===
Upper (Kokonor) Mongols from northern Xinjiang and Khalkha came there in 16th and 17th centuries. Power struggles among various Mongol factions in Tibet and Amdo led to a period alternating between the supremacy of the Dalai Lama (nominally) and Mongol overlords. In 1642, Tibet was reunified under the 5th Dalai Lama, by gaining spiritual and temporal authority through the efforts of the Mongol king, Güshi Khan. This allowed the Gelug school and its incarnated spiritual leaders, the Dalai Lamas, to gain enough support to last through the present day. Gushi Khan also returned portions of Eastern Tiber (Kham) to Tibet, but his base in the Kokonor region of Amdo remained under Mongol control.

=== 18th century ===
In 1705, with the approval of the Kangxi Emperor of the Qing dynasty, Lha-bzang Khan of the Khoshut deposed the regent and killed the 6th Dalai Lama. The Dzungar Mongols invaded Tibet during the chaos, and held the entire region until their final defeat by an expedition of the Qing imperial army in 1720.

When the Manchu Qing dynasty rose to power in the early 18th century it established Xining, a town to the north of Amdo, as the administrative base for the area. Amdo was placed within the Qinghai Region. During this period they were ruled by the Amban, who allowed near total autonomy by the monasteries and the other local leaders.

The 18th century saw the Qing Empire continue to expand further and further into Tibet as it engulfed Eastern Tibet including Amdo and even assumed control over Central Tibet.

Shadzong Ritro near Taktser in Amdo

The Yongzheng Emperor seized full control of Qinghai (Amdo) in the 1720s. The boundaries of Xining Prefecture, which contains most of Amdo, with Sichuan and Tibet-proper was established following this. The boundary of Xining Prefecture and Ü-Tsang, or Central Tibet, was the Dangla Mountains. This roughly corresponds with the modern boundary of Qinghai with the Tibet Autonomous Region. The boundary of Xining Prefecture with Sichuan was also set at this time, dividing the Ngaba area of the former Amdo into Sichuan. This boundary also roughly corresponds with the modern boundary of Qinghai with Sichuan. A new boundary, following the Ning-ching mountain range, was established between Sichuan and Tibet. East of these mountains, local chieftains ruled under the nominal authority of the Sichuan provincial government; Lhasa administered the area to the west. The 1720s thus saw Tibet's first major reduction in area in centuries. The Gansu region bordering Tibet was administered by an imperial viceroy. Portions of the country were placed under Chinese law while the Tibetans enjoyed almost complete independence, ruled by Tibetan chiefs that held grants or commissions from the Imperial Government.

=== 20th century ===
In 1906, the 13th Dalai Lama while touring the country, was enticed by a procession of a thousand lamas, to stay at the temple at Kumbum. He spent a year resting and learning among other things Sanskrit and poetry.

In 1912, Qing Dynasty collapsed and relative independence followed with the Dalai Lama ruling Central Tibet. Eastern Tibet, including Amdo and Kham, were ruled by local and regional warlords and chiefs. The Hui Muslims administered the agricultural areas in the north and east of the region. Amdo saw numerous powerful leaders including both secular and non. The monasteries, such as Labrang, Rebkong, and Taktsang Lhamo supervised the choosing of the local leaders or headmen in the areas under their control. These tribes consisted of several thousand nomads. Meanwhile, Sokwo, Ngawa, and Liulin, had secular leaders appointed, with some becoming kings and even creating familial dynasties. This secular form of government went as far as Machu.

The Muslim warlord Ma Qi waged war in the name of the Republic of China against the Labrang monastery and Goloks. After ethnic rioting between Muslims and Tibetans emerged in 1918, Ma Qi defeated the Tibetans, then commenced to tax the town heavily for 8 years. In 1925, a Tibetan rebellion broke out, with thousands of Tibetans driving out the Muslims. Ma Qi responded with 3,000 Chinese Muslim troops, who retook Labrang and machine gunned thousands of Tibetan monks as they tried to flee. Ma Qi besieged Labrang numerous times, the Tibetans and Mongols fought against his Muslim forces for control of Labrang, until Ma Qi gave it up in 1927. His forces were praised by foreigners who traveled through Qinghai for their fighting abilities. However, that was not the last Labrang saw of General Ma. The Muslim forces looted and ravaged the monastery again.

In 1928, the Ma Clique formed an alliance with the Kuomintang. In the 1930s, the Muslim warlord Ma Bufang, the son of Ma Qi, seized the northeast corner of Amdo in the name of Chiang Kai-shek's weak central government, effectively incorporating it into the Chinese province of Qinghai. From that point until 1949, much of the rest of Amdo was gradually assimilated into the Kuomintang Chinese provincial system, with the major portion of it becoming nominally part of Qinghai province and a smaller portion becoming part of Gansu province. Due to the lack of a Chinese administrative presence in the region, however, most of the communities of the rural areas of Amdo and Kham remained under their own local, Tibetan lay and monastic leaders into the 1950s. Tibetan region of Lho-Jang and Gyarong in Kham, and Ngapa (Chinese Aba) and Golok in Amdo, were still independent of Chinese hegemony, despite the creation on paper of Qinghai Province in 1927.

The 14th Dalai Lama was born in the Amdo region, in 1935, and when he was announced as a possible candidate, Ma Bufang tried to prevent the boy from travelling to Tibet. He demanded a ransom of 300,000 dollars, which was paid and then he escorted the young boy to Tibet.

In May 1949, Ma Bufang was appointed Military Governor of Northwest China, making him the highest-ranked administrator of the Amdo region. However, by August 1949, the advancing People's Liberation Army (PLA) had annihilated Ma's army, though residual forces took several years to defeat. By 1949, advance units of the PLA had taken much of Amdo from the Nationalists. By 1952, following the annexation of Tibet by the People's Republic of China, the major towns in the region were fully under the control of People's Republic of China, though many of the rural areas continued to enjoy de facto autonomy for several more years. Tibetan guerrilla forces in Amdo emerged in 1956 and continued until the 1970s fighting the People's Liberation Army.

In 1958, Chinese communists assumed official control of Tibetan regions in Kham and Amdo. Many of the nomads of Amdo revolted. Some areas were reported virtually empty of men: They either had been killed or imprisoned or had fled. The largest monastery in Amdo was forced to close. Of its three thousand monks, two thousand were arrested.

In July 1958 as the revolutionary fervor of the Great Leap Forward swept across the People's Republic of China, Zeku County in the Amdo region of cultural Tibet erupted in violence against efforts by the Chinese Communist Party to impose rapid collectivization on the pastoral communities of the grasslands. Rebellion also stirred the region at the beginning of the 1950s as "Liberation" first settled on the northeastern Tibetan plateau. The immediate ramifications of each disturbance both for the Amdo Tibetan elites and commoners, and for the Han cadres in their midst, elucidates early PRC nation-building and state-building struggles in minority nationality areas and the influence of this crucial transitional period on relations between Han and Tibetan in Amdo decades later.

As a prelude to the Beijing Olympics, protests broke out in 2008 in Amdo, among other places. Some were violent; however the majority were peaceful.

== Monasteries ==
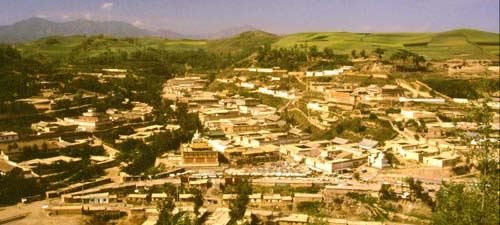
Panoramic view of Kumbum Monastery in Amdo

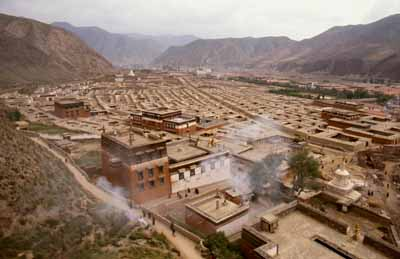
Labrang Monastery in Amdo

Amdo was traditionally a place of great learning and scholarship and contains many great monasteries including Kumbum Monastery near Xining, Rongwo Monastery in Rebgong, Labrang Monastery south of Lanzhou, and the Kirti Gompas of Ngawa Tibetan and Qiang Autonomous Prefecture and Taktsang Lhamo in Dzoge County.

From 1958 to 1962, the political climate in Amdo was considered unbearable. In 1958, the arrest and murder of the Tseten Monastery's Khenpo Jigme Rigpai Nyingpo while incarcerated in Xining's Nantan prison marked the beginning of the period.

== Traditional economy ==
Amdo Tibetans' traditional lifestyle and economy are centered on agriculture. Depending on the region and environment Amdo Tibetans live in, they are either nomads (Drog pa) or farmers (Sheng pa). The economy of Amdo of has been constant throughout history and has changed little in the modern time. A typical family has two homes or bases: one for when they move up into the mountains with their animals in the summer for better grazing, and another down in the valleys where they weather harsh winters and grow fodder for their livestock in small agricultural fields. The families of some villages may make a shorter seasonal trek as their pasture may be nearby, and they may even migrate between homes each day.

== Local government ==
As in Amdo and Kham, independent local polities were the traditional governing systems. In Amdo, communities of nomads, farmers, horse traders and monasteries were organized into these polities, which continued from the era of the Tibetan Empire. Varying in size from small to large, some were inherited while others were not, and both women and men were individual leaders of these polities.

Tsowas, consisting of groups of families, are the basic socio-cum-political organization. The Golok peoples, Gomé and Lutsang peoples arranged themselves in tsowas. A larger organisation is the sgar, translated as 'encampment', while larger still is the nangso, translated as 'commissioner'. There were also kingdoms, such as Kingdom of Co ne (Choné). In 1624, for example, the Drotsang Nangso sponsored a monastery which was called the Drotsang Sargön; the monastery at Detsa Nangso was called the Detsa Gompa. Earlier in 1376, a Horse and Tea Trading Station was in Co né.

After the People's Republic of China's (PRC) was founded, communist administrators overlaid a series of larger Tibetan Autonomous Prefectures (TAP) on top of the existing county system, but only where Tibetans formed the majority of the population. This policy towards Tibetans, considered a "minority nationality" within their own country, was set down in the constitution of the PRC.

== See also ==
- List of traditional regions of Tibet
