= Khoshut =

Branch of the Mongols

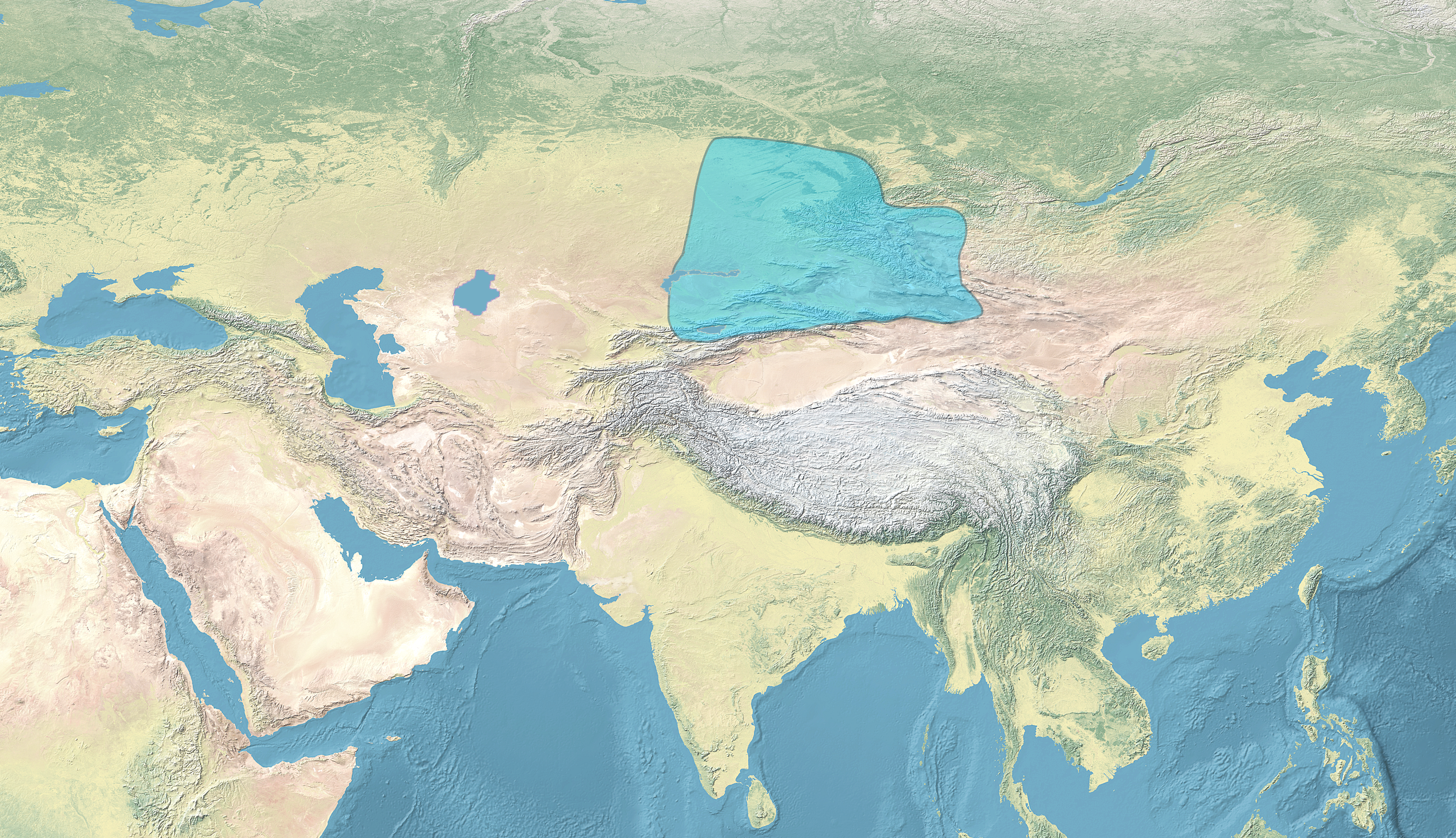
- The Khoshuts with the Oirat Confederation

Regions with significant populations

Languages
- Oirat dialect

Religion
- Tibetan Buddhism, Mongolian shamanism

Related ethnic groups
- Mongols, especially Oirats

The Khoshut (Mongolian: Хошууд, ᠬᠤᠱᠤᠳ, qoşūd, Chinese: 和碩特; literally 'bannermen', from Middle Mongolian qosighu 'flag, banner') are one of the four major tribes of the Oirat people. They established the Khoshut Khanate in the area of Qinghai in 1642–1717.

== History ==
Originally, Khoshuuds were one of the Khorchin tribes in southeastern Mongolian Plateau, but in the mid-15th century they migrated to western Mongolian Plateau to become an ally of the Oirats to counter the military power in central Mongolian Plateau. Their ruling family Galwas was the Hasarid-Khorchins who were deported by the Western Mongols.

The Khoshuts first appeared in the 1580s and by the 1620s were the most powerful Oirat tribe. They led others in converting to Buddhism. In 1636 Güshi Khan led many Khoshuds to occupy Kokenuur (Qinghai). The Khoshut Khanate was established in 1642. Some time after 1645, his brother Kondeleng Ubashi migrated to the Volga, joining the Kalmyks. However, many Khoshuts remained in the Oirat homeland Dzungaria under Ochirtu Setsen.

After the Dzungar leader Galdan Boshogtu Khan killed Ochirtu, the Khoshut chief Khoroli submitted to the Qing dynasty with his people in 1686 and resettled in Alashan.

The Khoshuts of the Dzungar Khanate remained influential until the Qing annihilated them in 1755. In 1771 the Volga Khoshuts fled back to Dzungaria with the Kalmyks and were resettled by the Qing around Bosten Lake. Their small remnants under a Tumen family in Kalmykia were influential until 1917. Another part of them was formed into a separate banner in Bulgan Province, Khovd Province; but they were counted as Torghut who migrated with them in much larger numbers.

=== 20th century ===
The Khoshuts in Alashan numbered 36,900 in 1990.

The Khoshuts around Bosten Lake numbered more than 12,000 in 1999.

== See also ==
- Lha-bzang Khan, Khoshut chief and King of Tibet
- Upper Mongols
