= Güshi Khan =

Khoshut-Mongol Khan and founder of the Khoshut Khanate

Güshi Khan Гүүш Хаан གུ་ཤྲི་ཧན
- Khan; Protector-ruler of Tibet
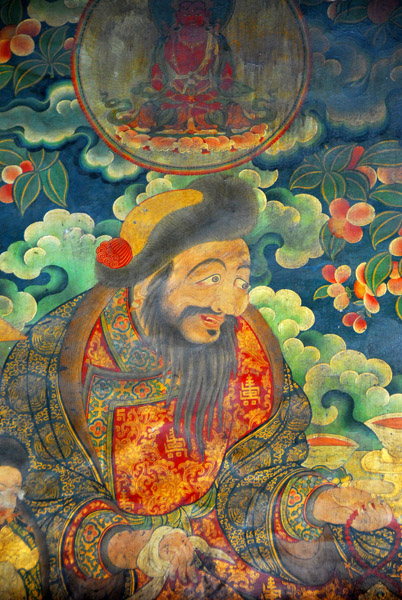

1st Khan of the Khoshut Khanate
- Reign: 1642-1655
- Successor: Dayan Ochir Khan
- Born: Torobaikhu (Төрбайх); 1582
- Died: 14 January 1655 (aged 72–73); Ü-Tsang, Tibet
Regnal name
- Güshi Khan (Гүүш Хаан); Tenzin Chökyi Gyalpo (བསྟན་འཛིན་ཆོས་ཀྱི་རྒྱལ་པོ)
- House: Borjigin
- Dynasty: Khoshut Khanate
- Father: Khanai Noyan Khonggor
- Mother: Akhai Khatun

Güshi Khan (1582 – 14 January 1655) was a Khoshut prince and founder of the Khoshut Khanate, who supplanted the Tumed descendants of Altan Khan as the main benefactor of the Dalai Lama and the Gelug school of Tibetan Buddhism. In 1637, Güshi Khan defeated a rival Mongol prince Choghtu Khong Tayiji, a Kagyu follower, near Qinghai Lake and established his khanate in Tibet over the next years. His military assistance to the Gelug school enabled the 5th Dalai Lama to establish political control over Tibet.

== Name ==
It is also spelt Gushri Khan and Gushihan. In other languages it is:

- Chinese: 固始汗
- Mongolian: ᠭᠦᠦᠱᠢ ᠬᠠᠭᠠᠨ (Гүүш хаан)
- Standard Tibetan: གུ་ཤྲཱི་བསྟན་འཛིན

== Early years ==
Güshi Khan was born Torobaikhu, the third son of Akhai Khatun and Khanai Noyan Khonggor, chief of the Khoshuts. He was descended from a younger brother of Genghis Khan, Qasar. At the age of 12, Torobaikhu had already won renown in battle against the Turkistanis. In 1625 a conflict erupted between the Khoshot chief Chöükür and his uterine brother Baibaghas over inheritance issues. Baibaghas was killed in the fight. However, his younger brothers Güshi and Köndölön Ubashi took up the fight and pursued Chöükür from the Ishim River to the Tobol River, attacking and killing his tribal followers in 1630. The infighting among the Oirats inspired one sub-group, the Torgut Oirat, to migrate westwards and eventually settle by the Volga River. Now Güshi succeeded to the position of Baibaghas as chief of the Khoshut.

== Intervention on behalf of the Dalai Lama ==
In 1615, when the Oirats were still under the suzerainty of the Khalkha leader Ubasi Khong Tayiji, the elite had largely converted to Tibetan Buddhism. However, the period saw a rise in internal religious rivalries within Tibet, in particular between the Gelug and Karma Kagyu schools. The main Gelug religious figure church was the Dalai Lama while the Karma Kagyu was supported by the dynasty of the Tsangpa based in Samdrubtse (modern Shigatse). They, in turn, found support from groups of Khalkhas and Chahars.

Sonam Rapten was the chief attendant during the youth of the 5th Dalai Lama (1617–1682). He drew up plans to end the persecution of the Gelug and unify Tibet with the help of Güshi. The Gelug monasteries appealed for help against the Karmapa and Bon partisans such as the Khalkha prince Choghtu Khong Tayiji, who had recently settled in Amdo. This was a very bold move since the Mongols had a reputation for ruthlessness against military foes and civilians alike. Güshi was known for his devotion to the Gelugpa and responded positively. He was joined in a pro-Gelugpa league by the other Oirat princes: his nephews Uchirtu Sechen and Ablai Tayiji in the Zaysan and Ertis areas; furthermore Erdeni Batur, whose Dzungar and Dörbet Oirat subjects lived by the Ulungur, Irtysh and Emil Rivers, and even the Torghut chief Kho Orluk, who was in the process of subduing areas to the north of the Aral and Caspian Seas. As it turned out, it would nevertheless take several years to install the "Great Fifth" as the head of a unified Tibetan state.

In the company of the Dzungar prince Erdeni Batur, Güshi marched into Qinghai with 10,000 Oirat troops in 1636. In the next year, he confronted the Khalkha forces of Choghtu Khung Tayiji, which were 30,000 strong and were opposed to the Gelugpa sect. A battle took place in 1637, on the Kokonor Gorge and is known as the Battle of the Bloody Hill. The Choghtu troops were defeated and scattered, and the survivors had to surrender. Choghtu himself hid in a marmot hole but was found and killed on the spot. In that way the Khalkhas were suppressed in Tibet a short time after they were subjugated in Mongolia by the invading Manchu people.

Güshi proceeded to Ü-Tsang in 1638 as a pilgrim. There he received religious instructions from the 5th Dalai Lama. During a ceremony in Lhasa, he was placed on a throne and proclaimed "Holder of the Doctrine Chogyal" (Wylie: bstan 'dzin chos kyi rgyal po, THL: Tendzin Chö kyi Gyelpo, Mongolian: Данзан Чойгии Жалбуу). By this time he was also known by the title of khagan, adopted in defiance of the Borjigid (the direct descendants of Genghis Khan).

Güshi invited the Dalai Lama to visit his territories, but the Great Fifth was unable to do so due to the unstable circumstances in Ü-Tsang. He did, however, send a permanent representative to the Khoshut to maintain good relations. Güshi Khan returned to his newly conquered realm in Qinghai, where the Khoshuts resolved to settle down.

== Invasion in Kham ==
New trouble soon followed. The king of Beri in Kham, Donyo Dorje, was a practitioner of the Bön religion and enemy of the Gelugpa. He allied with the Tsangpa ruler Karma Tenkyong and sent a message, suggesting that the troops of Kham and Tsang would attack the Gelugpa stronghold in Ü in concert. The aim was to eradicate the Gelugpa and allow freedom of worship for the other sects. The message was intercepted and forwarded to Güshi Khan, who used it as a pretext for a new invasion. The Dalai Lama is said to have been opposed to creating more bloodshed, but Sonam Rapten went behind his back and encouraged Güshi to destroy the Beri ruler. The campaign was prepared in 1639, assisted by some Tibetans. In June of that year, Güshi moved against Beri and subjugated most of Donyo Dorje's subjects. On 6 January 1641, according to the chronicles of the 5th Dalai Lama, "the ruler of Beri and others fled to a well-defended frontier, but as by the sharp iron of a person's virtue, the phenomenon of magnet and iron-filings takes place, so they were all captured and placed in a large prison-yard. All the root causes of unhappiness were removed from their places. The lamas and rulers of the Sakyapa, Gelugpa, Karmapa, Drukpa and Taklungpa were brought out of the prison dungeons where they had been placed and sent back to their own. The people up to the king of Jang paid taxes in money and earnestly sought to bow to him respectfully." The Beri ruler was executed and all the Dalai Lama's enemies in Kham were crushed.

== Conquest of Central Tibet ==
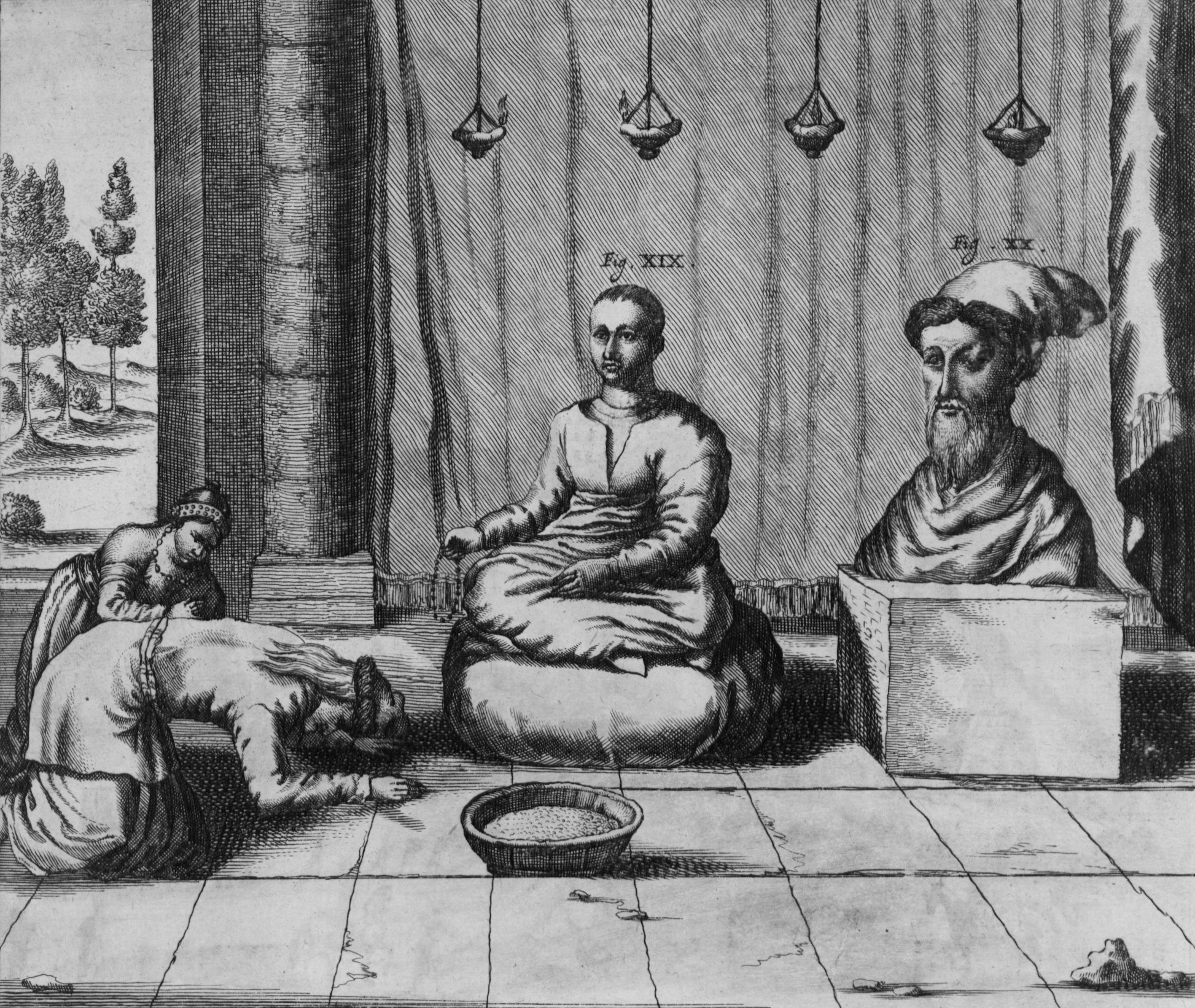
Statues of the Fifth Dalai Lama and (apparently) Güshi Khan seen by Johann Grueber in the lobby of the Dalai Lama's palace in 1661

Having subdued Kham entirely by 1641, Güshi proceeded to invade the domain of Karma Tenkyong in Tsang. His reputation as an invincible warrior rendered resistance weak. Meanwhile, Sonam Rapten was busy taking over districts in Ü which paid allegiance to the Tsangpa. The Khoshut troops besieged Shigatse, the stronghold of Karma Tenkyong. An eyewitness described the horrors of the siege: "[the place] had turned into a big cremation ground covered with heaps of corpses deprived of their lives as one had given a flock of sheep to a pack of wolves". All attempts of mediation failed, and the monastic settlement and the suburbs fell on the 8th day of the 1st month of the Water-Horse year 1642. This was followed by the surrender of the castle on the 25th day of the 2nd month (25 March). Karma Tenkyong's life was spared for the moment and he was imprisoned in Neu, south-east of Lhasa. As for Güshi Khan, according to the 5th Dalai Lama's chronicles, "When the crystal lord [the moon] of the month of Chaitra was full [14 April 1642], from that day of the first season of the year according to the Kalachakra, he became king of the three parts of Tibet and set up the white umbrella of his laws on the peak of the world". On the 5th day of the 4th month in 1642, the Dalai Lama was led in state to the palace of Shigatse and seated on the throne of the deposed king. With this act, he replaced the rival dominant school of the Karmapas. Güshi Khan then declared that he bestowed the supreme authority of Tibet on Dalai Lama, from Tachienlu in the east to the Ladakh border in the west. The 5th Dalai Lama in his turn confirmed the position of Güshi Khan as the Dharma king (or chogyal) of Tibet.

The upheavals of the Mongol conquest led to famine and hardship. There was moreover still opposition against the Güshi Khan-Dalai Lama ruling constellation. The Karmapa hierarch Chöying Dorje was requested by the Dalai Lama to sign a formal agreement that he would not cause any further trouble. The Karmapa refused, arguing that he had not fomented trouble in the past. Mongol and Tibetan soldiers then surrounded his large movable encampment (gar). Chöying Dorje managed to sneak out at the last minute, but the troops broke in, ravaged the camp and killed anyone who resisted. The Karmapa hierarch fled to the mountains in the south. The surviving supporters of the Tsangpa and Karma Kagyü took up resistance in the Kongpo region in the southeast. The incensed Güshi Khan gave orders to execute his royal prisoner Karma Tenkyong, while his army ravaged Kongpo and killed 7,000 rebels. The remainder gave up. Many Karma Kagyü monasteries in the country were forcibly converted to Gelugpa, while Nyingma monks who had performed Mongol-repelling exorcism were imprisoned.

== After unification ==
The new political system renewed the old concept of chö-yön (patron and priest relationship) which had roots back to the relation between the Sakya lamas and the Mongol great khans during the Yuan dynasty. While the Dalai Lama was the highest figure in spiritual authority, the Khoshut ruler maintained control over the armed forces; however, he did not significantly interfere in the affairs of Central Tibet. He tended to spend the summers in the pastureland of Dam by the Tengri-nor Lake, some 80 miles to the north of Lhasa which he visited in wintertime. The bulk of the semi-nomadic Khoshots stayed with their herds around the Tsongön Lake (Qinghai Lake). Sonam Rapten acted as regent (desi) and was formally appointed by the Khoshut king. Shortly after unification, a conflict broke out with Bhutan, recently unified under the Tibetan lama Ngawang Namgyal. Güshi Khan and the regent sent several hundred Mongol and Tibetan troops into Bhutan in 1644. However, the Mongol warriors were unused to the climate and the expedition suffered a major defeat. This broke some of the Mongol reputation for invincibility. A peace was concluded in 1646 but was soon violated. Fresh fighting in the following year led to another defeat for the Dalai Lama state.

Gushi Khan died in January 1655, leaving ten sons:

- Dayan Khan
- Bonpo Sechen Daiching
- Dalantai
- Bayan Abugai
- Elduchi
- Dorje Dalai Batur
- Hurimashi
- Sanggaerzha Yiledeng
- Gunbu Chahun
- Tashi Batur

Furthermore, Güshi's daughter Amin Dara married Erdeni Batur, the founder of the Dzungar Khanate. Güshi's eldest son Dayan succeeded him in his dignity as Dharma king of Tibet and protector of the faith. However, eight sons with their tribal followers, led by Dorje Dalai Batur, settled in the strategically important Tsongön Lake region in Amdo after 1648. They were known as the Eight Khoshuts and quarreled constantly over territory. The 5th Dalai Lama sent several governors in 1656 and 1659. The Mongols were gradually Tibetanised and played an important role in extending the Gelug school's influence in Amdo. The system with a Khoshut protector ruler over Tibet lasted for four generations, up to 1717.

== See also ==
- History of Tibet
- Mongol conquest of Tibet
- Patron and priest relationship

== Further references ==
- Haines, R Spencer (2018). "Charismatic Authority in Context: An Explanation of Guushi Khan's Swift Rise to Power in the Early 17th Century". Mongolica: An International Journal of Mongolian Studies. 52. International Association of Mongolists: 24–31.
- Matthew Kapstein, The Tibetans. Oxford: Blackwell 2006.
- Tsepon W. D. Shakabpa, One hundred thousand moons, Vols. I-II. Leiden: Brill 2010.
- Wang Furen and Suo Wenqing, Highlights of Tibetan history. Beijing: New World Press 1984.
- Ya Hanzhang, Biographies of the Tibetan Spiritual Leaders Panchen Erdenis. Beijing: Foreign Languages Press 1994.

Preceded by Karma Tenkyong (Tsangpa)	Khan of the Khoshut Khanate; Protector-ruler of Tibet; 1642–1655	Succeeded by Dayan Khan
