= Huayi =

Huayi may refer to:

- Overseas Chinese, or Huayi, people of Chinese birth or descent who live outside China
- Huayi Brothers, Chinese entertainment and record company
- Hua-Yi distinction, ancient Chinese conception that differentiated a culturally defined "China" from cultural or ethnic outsiders
