= Treason by the Book =

- First edition
- Author: Jonathan Spence
- Language: English
- Genre: Historical
- Publisher: Viking Press
- Publication date: 2001
- Publication place: United States
- Media type: Print
- ISBN: 0-14-102779-7

Treason by the Book, by Jonathan Spence, is a historical account of the Zeng Jing (曾靜) case which took place during the reign of the Yongzheng Emperor of Qing China around 1730. Zeng Jing, a failed degree candidate heavily influenced by the seventeenth-century scholar Lü Liuliang, in October 1728 attempted to incite the descendant of Yue Fei, Yue Zhongqi (岳仲琪), Governor-general of Shaanxi-Sichuan, to rebellion. He gave a long list of accusations against Yongzheng, including the murder of the Kangxi Emperor and the killing of his brothers. This triggered a series of investigations which captured the attention of Yongzheng, who was eager to make his ascent to the throne seem legitimate. Highly concerned with the implications of the case, Yongzheng had Zeng Jing brought to Beijing for trial. But instead of imposing an immediate death sentence, the emperor began an intensive, written conversation with Zeng Jing. Zeng Jing eventually wrote a confession of error and received pardon for his crimes. The emperor then decided to circulate the relevant documents, including the original note, nationwide as a civics lesson for his subjects.

However, Yongzheng's sudden death in 1735 caused a turn of events as the Qianlong Emperor, Yongzheng's successor, sensitive to the potentially defamatory material that was making its rounds across the country, went against his father's wishes in recalling and destroying his father's response, the Dayi Juemi Lu (大義覺迷錄; literally: "Records of great righteousness resolving confusion"), as well as executing Zeng. Lü Liuliang's coffin was ordered to be opened, and his corpse was mutilated in public.
