= Little China (ideology) =

Politico-cultural ideology

Little China Ideology

Chinese name
- Traditional Chinese: 小中華
- Simplified Chinese: 小中华
Transcriptions
Standard Mandarin
- Hanyu Pinyin: Xiǎo Zhōnghuá

Vietnamese name
- Vietnamese alphabet: Tiểu Trung Hoa
- Chữ Hán: 小中華

Korean name
- Hangul: 소중화
- Hanja: 小中華
Transcriptions
- Revised Romanization: Sojunghwa

Japanese name
- Kanji: 小中華
- Kana: しょうちゅうか
Transcriptions
- Revised Hepburn: Shōchūka

Little China refers to a politico-cultural ideology and phenomenon in which various Japanese, Korean and Vietnamese regimes identified themselves as the "Central State" and regarded themselves to be legitimate successors to the Chinese civilization. Informed by the traditional Chinese concepts of Sinocentrism and Sino–barbarian dichotomy, this belief became more apparent after the Manchu-led Qing dynasty had superseded the Han-led Ming dynasty in China proper, as Sinosphere countries like Tokugawa Japan, Joseon Korea and Nguyễn Vietnam perceived for a while that "barbarians" had ruined the center of world civilization.

== Little China ideology in the Sinosphere ==
Since ancient times, the realm of "China" has not been a fixed or predetermined concept based on ethnicity or geographical location. According to the Spring and Autumn Annals, "Chinese" people who adopt the ways of the "barbarians" would be considered "barbarians", whereas "barbarians" who adopt the ways of the "Chinese" would be accepted as "Chinese". Hence, the idea of "Chinese-ness" is a fluid concept and is defined through self-identification and cultural affiliation.

Having heavily participated what is now known as Chinese culture, including connected political concepts, numerous Korean, Vietnamese and Japanese regimes identified themselves with descriptive names that are traditionally associated with what is now known as China. At the same time, these regimes considered themselves legitimate successors to that culture and civilization.

Names of China in the Sinophere
Name	Mandarin	Cantonese	Middle Chinese	Korean	Vietnamese	Japanese
中國	Zhōngguó	zung1 gwok3	Ʈɨuŋkwək̚	중국 (Jungguk)	Trung Quốc	Chūgoku
中華	Zhōnghuá	zung1 waa4	Ʈɨuŋɦˠua	중화 (Junghwa)	Trung Hoa	Chūka
華夏	Huáxià	waa4 haa6	Ɦˠuaɦˠa	화하 (Hwaha)	Hoa Hạ	Kaka
中夏	Zhōngxià	zung1 haa6	Ʈɨuŋɦˠa^{X}	중하 (Jungha)	Trung Hạ	Chūka
中朝	Zhōngcháo	zung1 ciu4	Ʈɨuŋʈˠiᴇu	중조 (Jungjo)	Trung Triều	Chūchō
神州	Shénzhōu	san4 zau1	ʑiɪnt͡ɕɨu	신주 (Sinju)	Thần Châu	Shinshū
華	Huá	waa4	Ɦˠua	화 (Hwa)	Hoa	Ka
夏	Xià	haa6	ɦˠa^{X}	하 (Ha)	Hạ	Ka

=== Korea ===
The "Little China" ideology for Korea emerged in the background of Joseon-Ming relations. The Korean Yangban, the scholar gentry of the Joseon dynasty, regarded the Ming the leader of the Tributary system of China. Bongjin Kim notes that "By entering the Ming tributary system, Joseon's Confucian elites firmly believed as did their Chinese counterparts that Joseon was superior among non-Chinese countries as sojunghwa".

In the 17th century, when the Manchu-led Qing dynasty replaced the Han-led Ming dynasty as the ruling dynasty of China proper, the Joseon dynasty believed that the Qing dynasty was unworthy of succeeding the politico-cultural orthodoxy of "China". Instead, the Confucianist Joseon dynasty asserted itself as the legitimate heir to the Chinese civilization and termed itself "Little Central Kingdom".

During the reigns of Joseon kings such as Injo of Joseon and Hyojong of Joseon, many Joseon officials believed that Joseon should support the Southern Ming, the remnants of the Ming dynasty, against the Qing during the Transition from Ming to Qing. These efforts were motivated by the Little China ideology. During the reign of the Yongzheng Emperor, the Qing won the loyalty of the Han Chinese gentry, which allowed them to portray the Qing as the legitimate successor of the Ming dynasty. Despite hesitation amongst Joseon literati, the incorporation of Chinese literati by the Qing allowed Joseon scholars to reconceptualize the Qing dynasty as the successor to the Ming's Confucian-led order.

During the reign of the Qianlong Emperor, the Northern Learning School (北學派) emerged in Joseon. According to scholars of the Northern Learning School, Joseon should actively learn from Qing China in order to make itself prosperous and powerful, as the Qing was the only channel for Joseon to learn. The rise of the Northern Learning School marked a turning point in Qing-Joseon relations, indicating a substantial shift in Joseon's identification with the Qing dynasty. Korean scholars and intellectuals began to use Zhongguo (China or Central Kingdom) to refer to the Qing dynasty since this period, and by the early 19th century reports by Korean envoys commonly referred to the Qing dynasty as Zhongguo.

As it had done for about two centuries, Joseon maintained steady ties with Qing China in the early 19th century. When Westerners first arrived in Korea in the 19th century, they saw a nation shrouded in China's shadow, and it appeared to them that Korea refused to open its borders without China's consent. Although the traditional Sino-Korean relationship appeared to offer nothing more than a diplomatic dead end to Western observers, both China and Korea claimed to be acting in accordance with the rules of the relationship that had bound the two nations in peace and harmony for many centuries. After Sunjo of Joseon, the Qing dynasty's reign titles were used by Joseon when signing treaties with foreign countries, which indicated that Joseon had not only fully accepted the Qing dynasty politically, but also represented a significant step forward in cultural identity, in that the Qing dynasty had already been accepted as culturally Chinese in Joseon's mainstream ideology.

=== Vietnam ===
Numerous Vietnamese dynasties attempted to replicate the Chinese tributary system in Southeast Asia, whilst maintaining tributary relations with Chinese dynasties. Vietnamese monarchs of multiple dynasties adopted the imperial title "hoàng đế" ( 皇帝; "emperor") domestically, but reverted to the royal title "vương" ( 王; "king") when dealing with China—a policy known as "emperor at home, king abroad". On many occasions, some Vietnamese monarchs styled themselves as the "Central Kingdom" or "Central State" and referred to various Chinese dynasties as "Bắc Triều" ( 北朝; "northern dynasty") in relation to Vietnam, self-styled as "Nam Triều" ( 南朝; "southern dynasty"). In 1010, Lý Thái Tổ issued the Edict on the Transfer of the Capital that likened himself to Chinese monarchs who initiated the relocation of the capital, effectively positioning the Lý dynasty within the politico-cultural realm of China.

The Nguyễn dynasty considered itself the legitimate heir to the Chinese civilization for a time. Emperor Gia Long once used "Trung Quốc" ( 中國) and "Hạ" ( 夏) to refer to the Nguyễn and earlier Vietnamese dynasties:

Trung Quốc vis-à-vis the outer barbarians [is akin to] the [properly] governed vis-à-vis the ungoverned [...]

The late king governed all under Heaven [by adhering to the principle that] Hạ should not intermix with the barbarians [...]

In the Poems on the Way to Min, Lý Văn Phức (a descendent of Ming Chinese refugees) escorted some stranded Chinese sailors back to Fujian province. However, when he arrived there, the guesthouse where he was supposed to stay had a sign over it which indicated that it was for "barbarians." Lý Văn Phức defended his position with an essay that highlighted that Vietnam followed the ways of China without the Manchurian influences of the 17th century and therefore should be considered "Hoa" ( 華):

In terms of governance and law, [Vietnam] follows [the ways of] the Two Emperors and Three Kings [of Ancient China]; in terms of [Confucian] orthodoxy, [Vietnam] adheres to [the teachings of] the Six Classics and Four Books, and subscribes to the schools of thought of Confucius, Mencius, Cheng Hao, Cheng Yi and Zhu Xi. In terms of knowledge, [Vietnam] consults The Commentary of Zuo, Discourses of the States and [the works of] Ban Gu and Sima Qian; in terms of writings, [Vietnamese] poetries and rhapsodies imitate [the styles of] the Selections of Refined Literature and that of Li Bai and Du Fu; in terms of calligraphies and paintings, [Vietnamese works] emulate [the styles of] the Rites of Zhou and the Six Methods and that of Zhong Yao and Wang Xizhi. [The procedures of] selecting the virtuous for government positions [in Vietnam have their roots in] the Han and Tang dynasties; the belts and headwear [of Vietnam originate from] the clothing [styles] of the Song and Ming dynasties. Since [Vietnam] follows the ways [of China], yet if [China considers the Vietnamese] as barbarians; how, then, do you define the meaning of Hoa?

As the Nguyễn dynasty developed ties with the Qing dynasty of China in 1803, it asked to be admitted to the Qing version of the Chinese Empire and to have the name Nam Viet ( 南越, from Nanyue) restored. The Jiaqing Emperor of Qing China granted the admission request (as a tributary state), but rejected the name Nam Viet and instead gave it the name Viet Nam ( 越南). Nevertheless, Qing China continued to refer to Vietnam by the ancient name Annam ( 安南) among themselves, whereas Emperor Minh Mạng adopted the name Dai Nam ( 大南), which was subsequently used in treaties signed with foreign countries (such as France). The name Viet Nam became more popular in the 20th century.

=== Japan ===
After the Qing dynasty had replaced the Ming dynasty in China proper, Japanese scholars declared that the Qing dynasty did not have the legitimacy to represent the politico-cultural realm of "China" whilst simultaneously explicitly identifying Japan as "China". In Kai Hentai by Hayashi Gahō and Hayashi Hōkō, it was argued that Japan had replaced the Qing dynasty as the center of Chinese civilization. In Chūchō Jijitsu by Yamaga Sokō, "Chūchō" (中朝; used in a similar sense as "Middle Kingdom"), "Chūka" (中華) and "Chūgoku" (中國) were adopted as alternative names for Japan, while "Gaichō" (外朝; "outer dynasty") was used to refer to the Qing dynasty.

During the reign of Tokugawa Ietsuna (r. 1651–1680), cultural exchanges with the Qing dynasty began. Tokugawa Ietsuna and several subsequent shoguns held the Qing dynasty in high esteem, referring to Qing China as the "upper country" (上國). The Japanese government and public in the Edo period also held the Qing emperors Kangxi and Qianlong in high esteem, especially Kangxi Emperor, whom they regarded as a "sage of the upper country" (上國聖人), whereas the era of the Qianlong Emperor was praised as a "rare and glorious period" (希代盛事). They also respected and admired the Yongzheng Emperor, who they referred to as a "rare and benevolent ruler" (希世仁君).

During the Meiji Restoration, the Emperor Meiji once issued an edict that referred to Japan as "Ka" (華):

[There is a] need to urgently rectify the nominal relations between the monarch and the officials, to make clear the distinctions between Ka and the barbarians and between the inner and outer domains, so as to uphold the cardinal principles of all under Heaven.

== See also ==
- Chinese influence on Japanese culture
- Chinese influence on Korean culture
- Conquest dynasty
- Pax Sinica
- Sadaejuui
- Succession of the Roman Empire
  - Translatio imperii
