= Yue Zhongqi =

Qing dynasty general (1686–1754)

Third Class Duke Weixin Yue Zhongqi 岳鍾琪
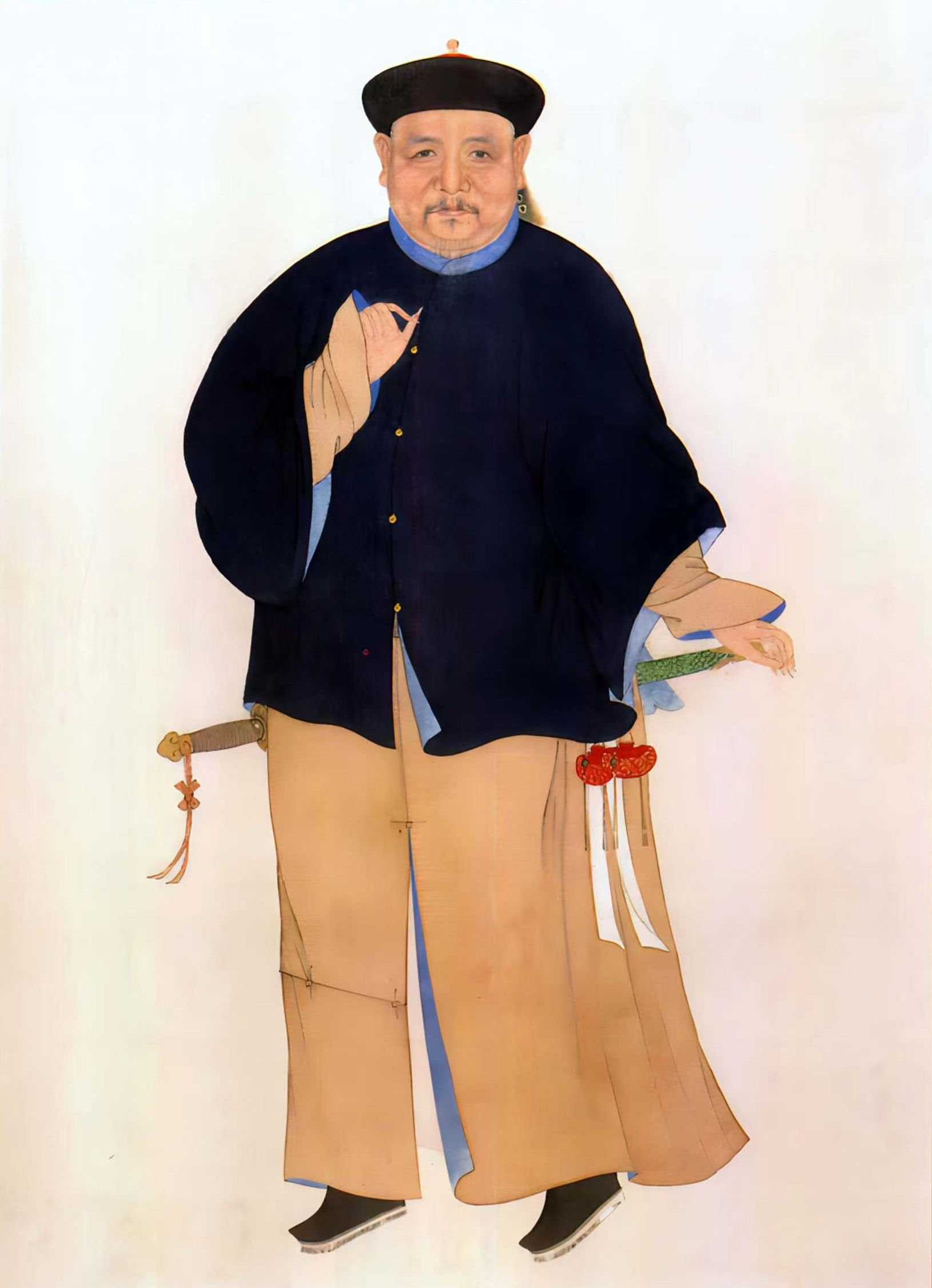

Viceroy of Chuan-Shaan
- In office 20 May 1725 – 27 November 1731
- Preceded by: Nian Gengyao
- Succeeded by: Jalangga (as Viceroy of Shaanxi)

Provincial military commander of Gansu
- In office 11 May 1724 – 20 May 1725
- Preceded by: Yang Qiyuan
- Succeeded by: Wangsong

Provincial military commander of Sichuan
- In office 18 June 1721 – 11 May 1724
- Preceded by: Kang Tai
- Succeeded by: Zhou Ying

Personal details
- Born: 8 November 1686 Zhuanglang, Liangzhou, Qing China
- Died: 2 April 1754 (aged 67) Zizhou, Qing China
- Children: Yue Jun (son)
- Parent: Yue Denglong (father)

Military service
- Allegiance: Qing dynasty
- Rank: General
- Battles/wars: Jinchuan campaigns Gyurme Namgyal Rebellion

Yue Zhongqi

Chinese name
- Traditional Chinese: 岳鍾琪
- Simplified Chinese: 岳锺琪
Transcriptions
Standard Mandarin
- Hanyu Pinyin: Yuè Zhōngqí

Courtesy name
- Traditional Chinese: 東美
- Simplified Chinese: 东美
Transcriptions
Standard Mandarin
- Hanyu Pinyin: Dōngměi

Art name
- Traditional Chinese: 容齋
- Simplified Chinese: 容斋
Transcriptions
Standard Mandarin
- Hanyu Pinyin: Róngzhāi

Posthumous name
- Chinese: 襄勤
Transcriptions
Standard Mandarin
- Hanyu Pinyin: Xiāngqín

Manchu name
- Manchu script: ᠶᠣᡠ ᠵᡠᠩ ᡴᡳ
- Romanization: yoo jung ki

Yue Zhongqi (Chinese: 岳鍾琪; 8 November 1686 – 2 April 1754) was a Chinese military commander of the Qing dynasty. He was a descendant of the Song dynasty general Yue Fei, and served as Minister of War and Viceroy of Chuan-Shaan during the reign of the Yongzheng Emperor.

Yue succeeded Nian Gengyao as Viceroy of Chuan-Shaan from 1725 to 1732. Zeng Jing, a xiucai in Hunan, sent his student Zhang Xi (張熙) to Xi'an in 1728, attempted to incite Yue to organize a plot to overthrow the Manchu-led Qing dynasty. Yue refused him and exposed his plot. Yue was commended by Yongzheng Emperor; Zeng Jing was easily caught and transported to Beijing.

Yue Zhongqi, much like the man who preceded him as Governor-General of Sichuan-Shaanxi (川陝總督), Nian Gengyao, acted as an important advisor and intermediary with regard to Tibetan affairs, which included navigating the Tibetan civil war of 1727-28.

Yue also participated in the Dzungar–Qing Wars. He conquered Tibet and seized Lhasa with the 2,000 Green Standard soldiers and 1,000 Manchu soldiers of the "Sichuan route" in 1720. He was accused of "arrogancy and unlawful act" (驕蹇不法) by Jalangga (查郎阿) and was stripped of official position in 1733. He didn't return to politics until 1748. He participated in Jinchuan campaigns, and later put down the rebellion of Gyurme Namgyal together with Ts'ereng (策楞).

== See also ==
- Qing dynasty in Inner Asia
- Tibet under Qing rule
- Treason by the Book

Government offices
| Preceded by Nian Gengyao | Viceroy of Chuan-Shaan; 1725–1732 | Succeeded by Jalangga |
