= Tributary state =

State in a subordinate relationship to another, more powerful state

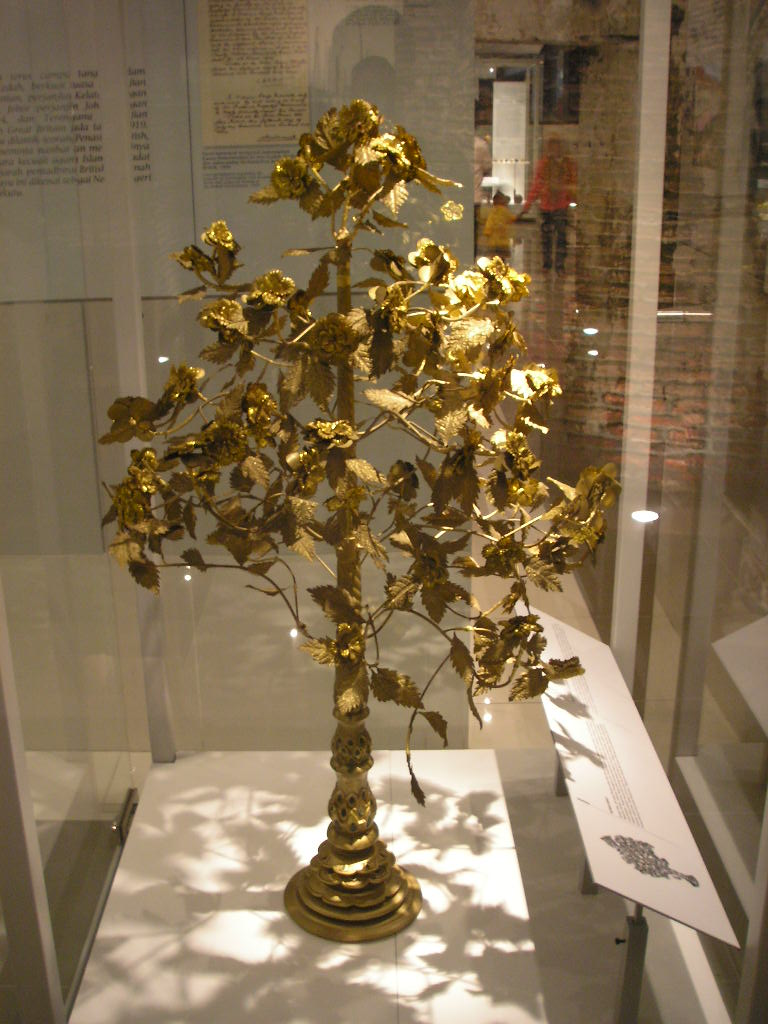
The bunga mas, a form of tribute sent to the King of Ayutthaya from its vassal states in the Malay Peninsula

A tributary state is a pre-modern state in a particular type of subordinate relationship to a more powerful state which involved the sending of a regular token of alliance, or tribute, to the superior power (the suzerain). This token often took the form of a substantial transfer of wealth, such as the delivery of gold, produce, or slaves, so that tribute might best be seen as the payment of protection money. It might also be more symbolic: sometimes it amounted to no more than the delivery of a mark of alliance such as the bunga mas (golden flower) that rulers in the Malay Peninsula used to send to the kings of Siam, or the Tribute of the Maltese Falcon that the Grand Master of the Order of St. John was required to send annually to the Viceroy of Sicily in order to rule Malta. It might also involve attendance by the subordinate ruler at the court of the hegemon in order to make a public show of submission.

The modern-day heirs of tribute hegemons tend to claim that the tributary relationship should be understood as an acknowledgement of the hegemon's sovereignty in the modern world, whereas former tributary states deny that there was any transfer of sovereignty.

A formalised tribute system developed in East Asia with many neighbouring East, Central, and Southeast Asian countries and regions becoming tributary states of various Chinese dynasties. Historically, the Emperor of China saw himself as the emperor of the entire civilised world. It was not possible for such an emperor to have equal diplomatic relations with any other power, and so all diplomatic relations in the region were construed by the Chinese as tributary. The disdain of the state ideology of Confucianism for trade, and the belief that Chinese civilisation had no need of products or technology from outside meant that trade, when it was permitted, was also construed as tributary. Diplomatic missions and trading parties from non-Chinese regions were interpreted in Chinese records as being tributary, regardless of the intention of those regions. Under this construction, the goods received by China constituted a tributary offering, while those that the visitors received were interpreted as gifts that the emperor in his kindness had bestowed upon his distant tributaries.

In Al-Andalus, the last remaining Moorish Nasrid dynasty in the Emirate of Granada paid tribute to the Christian Kingdom of Castile (present-day Spain). Tributary states, usually on the periphery of the Ottoman Empire, were under vassalage in different forms. Some were allowed to select their own leaders, while others paid tribute for their lands. In the Western colonial system, non-Western states were sometimes incorporated into a European empire as protectorates.

In the Philippines, the Datus of the Barangays became vassals of the Spanish Empire, from the late 16th century until the Archipelago fell under the power of the United States of America in 1898. Their right to rule was recognised by King Philip II of Spain, on 11 June 1594, under the condition of paying tributes due to the Spanish Crown.^{[a]}

== See also ==
- Bunga mas
- Client state
- Emperor at home, king abroad
- Mandala (political model)
- Puppet state
- Satellite state
- Sphere of influence
- Suzerainty
- Tribute
- Vassal state

== Notes ==
a. The king further ordered that the natives should pay to these nobles the same respect that the inhabitants accorded to their local lords before the conquest, without prejudice to the things that pertain to the king himself or to the encomenderos (trusteeship leaders). The original royal decree (Recapilación de leyes; in Spanish) says:

No es justo, que los Indios Principales de Filipinas sean de peor condición, después de haberse convertido, ántes de les debe hacer tratamiento, que los aficione, y mantenga en felicidad, para que con los bienes espirituales, que Dios les ha comunicado llamándolos a su verdadero conocimiento, se junten los temporales, y vivan con gusto y conveniencia. Por lo qua mandamos a los Gobernadores de aquellas Islas, que les hagan buen tratamiento, y encomienden en nuestro nombre el gobierno de los Indios, de que eran Señores, y en todo lo demás procuren, que justamente se aprovechen haciéndoles los Indios algún reconocimiento en la forma que corría el tiempo de su Gentilidad, con que esto sin perjuicio de los tributos, que á Nos han de pagar, ni de lo que á sus Encomenderos.

This translates into English as:

"It is not right that the Indian Principales of the Philippines be in a worse condition after conversion; rather they should have such treatment that would gain their affection and keep them loyal, so that with the spiritual blessings that God has communicated to them by calling them to his true knowledge, the temporal blessings may be added, and they may live contentedly and comfortably. Therefore, we order the governors of those islands to show them good treatment and entrust them, in our name, with the government of the Indians, of whom they were formerly Lords. In all else the governors shall see that the Principales are benefited justly, and the Indians shall pay them something as a recognition, as they did during the period of their paganism, provided it be without prejudice to the tributes that are to be paid us, or prejudicial to that which pertains to their Encomenderos."
