= Zeng Jing (Qing dynasty) =

Chinese official

Zeng Jing (Chinese: 曾靜, 1679 – 1736) was a minor Chinese official in Hunan who attempted to instigate a rebellion against the Qing government in the 18th century. Inspired by the poet and influential Confucian scholar Lü Liuliang's anti-Manchu writings, Zeng conspired to overthrow the Yongzheng Emperor and Qing dynasty. However, Yue Zhongqi, governor-general of Sichuan and Shaanxi, uncovered Zeng's plans. Imprisoned in Beijing, Zeng eventually recanted his views and received the Yongzheng emperor's pardon. However, the Qianlong Emperor, immediately upon his succession, arrested and executed Zeng Jing.

== Attempt at overthrow ==
Interpreting floods as signs of dynastic mismanagement of the land and state, Zeng Jing attempted to organize a plot to overthrow the Manchu-led Qing dynasty in 1728. He approached Yue Zhongqi for aid, but Yue, already under suspicion by the Qing, exposed Zeng Jing's plot. Zeng Jing and his few conspirators were easily caught and transported to Beijing, capital of Qing. Zeng also published a tract attacking the Yongzheng Emperor, accusing him of plotting against his father, the Kangxi Emperor, of killing his brothers in a bid for power, and of licentiousness.

== Imperial response ==
=== The Yongzheng Emperor ===
On learning of Zeng Jing's treasonous texts, the Yongzheng Emperor did not immediately execute Zeng Jing. In fact, Yongzheng was grateful for Zeng's tract because it provided Yongzheng an opportunity to clarify some of his own positions. Instead of punishment, Yongzheng carried out a correspondence with Zeng Jing while the latter was imprisoned. Yongzheng eventually convinced Zeng Jing to renounce his anti-Manchu views and pardoned Zeng. It had been the case that Lü Liuliang (1629-1683) had deeply influenced Zeng Jing's thought. Closer examination of Lü's texts revealed that Lü harbored deeply anti-Manchu beliefs and that he considered the Manchus barbarians. Yongzheng exhumed Lü's remains and pulverized them. Yongzheng also issued and distributed a response throughout the empire, the Dayi Juemi Lu (大義覺迷錄: “A Record of Righteous Principles to Awaken the Deluded”) in which he argued against the principles that gave rise to Zeng Jing's plot in the first place and stated that there are really no differences between the ethnicities. Yongzheng later allowed Zeng Jing to return to Henan and even gave him some gifts on his departure from Beijing.

=== The Qianlong Emperor ===
The Qianlong Emperor, immediately upon his succession to the throne, arrested and executed Zeng Jing in 1736 in direct opposition to Yongzheng's directive that none of his descendants reopen the case. Qianlong explained that Yongzheng had punished Lü Liuliang because Lü had offended Yongzheng's imperial ancestors, but had treated Zeng Jing with clemency because Zeng attacked only Yongzheng. Now that Yongzheng had passed, Qianlong desired to punish Zeng Jing for offending his imperial ancestor. He also recalled all copies of the Dayi Juemi Lu and destroyed them.

== See also ==
- Treason by the Book
- Literary inquisition
