= Huaxia =

Ancient Chinese self-designation of the Central Plains peoples

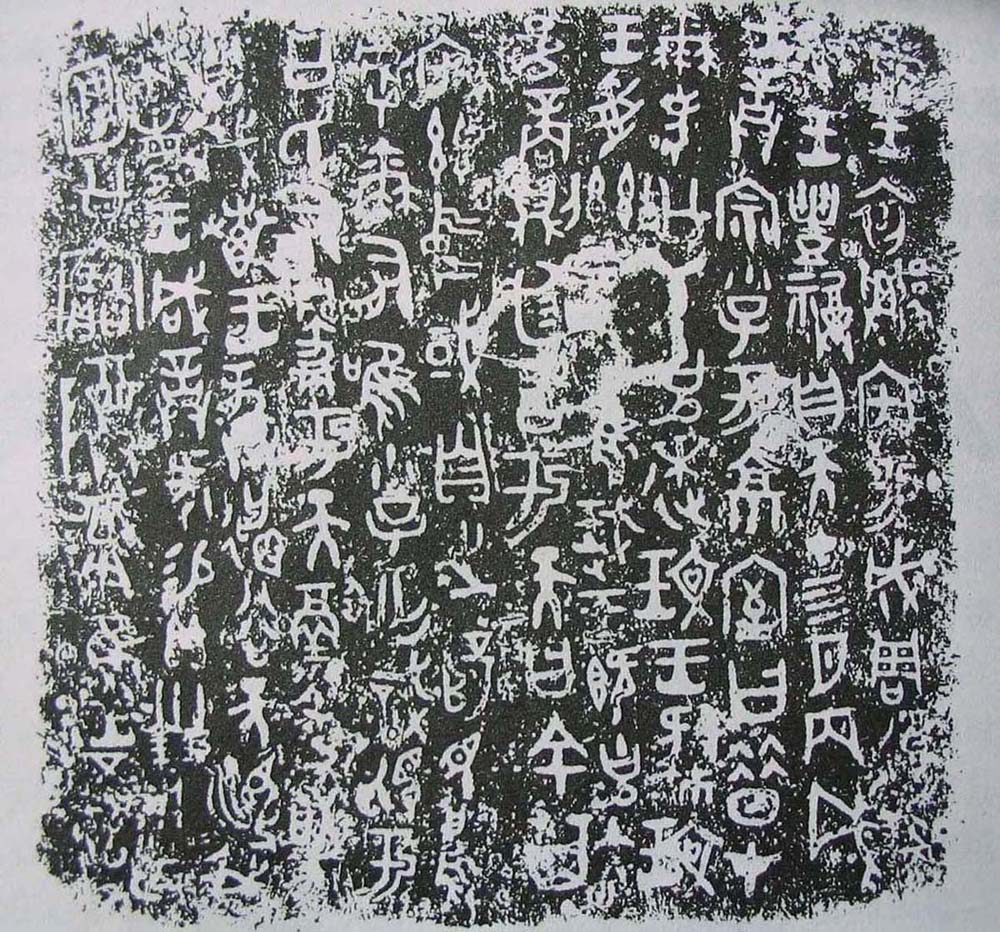
- The inscription on the He zun (c. 1038 BCE), containing the earliest known written form of the phrase Zhongguo (中國, "Central State" or "Middle Kingdom"). The term Huaxia itself is not attested until the Spring and Autumn period.
- Traditional Chinese: 華夏
- Simplified Chinese: 华夏
- Literal meaning: "beautiful and grand"; also read as "splendid" and "refined"
Transcriptions
Standard Mandarin
- Hanyu Pinyin: Huáxià
- Bopomofo: ㄏㄨㄚˊ ㄒㄧㄚˋ
- Gwoyeu Romatzyh: Hwashiah
- Wade–Giles: Hua^{2}-hsia^{4}
- Yale Romanization: Hwásyà
- IPA: [xwǎ.ɕjâ]
Wu
- Wugniu: gho^{2} gho^{4}
- IPA: Shanghainese: [ɦo˨ ɦo˦]
Yue: Cantonese
- Yale Romanization: wàh hah
- Jyutping: waa^{4} haa^{6}
- IPA: [wa˩.ha˨]
Southern Min
- Hokkien POJ: hôa-hā
- Tâi-lô: huâ-hā
Middle Chinese
- Middle Chinese: hwæ hæX
Old Chinese
- Baxter–Sagart (2014): *N-qʷʰˤra [ɢ]ˤraʔ

Alternative Chinese name
- Traditional Chinese: 華
- Simplified Chinese: 华
Transcriptions
Standard Mandarin
- Hanyu Pinyin: Huá
- Bopomofo: ㄏㄨㄚˊ
- Wade–Giles: Hua^{2}
- IPA: [xwǎ]
Wu
- Wugniu: gho^{2}
- IPA: Shanghainese: [ɦo˨˧]
Yue: Cantonese
- Yale Romanization: wàh
- Jyutping: waa^{4}
- IPA: [wa˩]
Southern Min
- Hokkien POJ: Hôa
- Tâi-lô: Huâ

Second alternative Chinese name
- Chinese: 夏
Transcriptions
Standard Mandarin
- Hanyu Pinyin: Xià
- Bopomofo: ㄒㄧㄚˋ
- Wade–Giles: Hsia^{4}
- IPA: [ɕjâ]
Wu
- Wugniu: gho^{4}
- IPA: Shanghainese: [ɦo˨˧]
Yue: Cantonese
- Yale Romanization: hah
- Jyutping: haa^{6}
- IPA: [ha˨]
Southern Min
- Hokkien POJ: Hā
- Tâi-lô: Hā

Huaxia (simplified Chinese: 华夏; traditional Chinese: 華夏; pinyin: Huáxià) is an ancient endonym used by the peoples of the middle and lower Yellow River basin to describe themselves and their civilisation. It is formed from two near-synonymous elements, Hua (華) and Xia (夏), which were each used independently as ethnic and cultural self-designations before being joined. The term was later used as a synonym for the Han Chinese people collectively, and in modern Chinese it functions chiefly as a poetic and historical name for China and for Chinese civilisation as a whole.

The concept behind the term is a cultural and ritual one rather than a genealogical one. In the classical texts where the word first appears, Hua and Xia are defined by possession of the classical rites (禮), correct dress and headgear, refined speech, and the shared music and canonical learning of the Zhou dynasty's central state(s). The Hua-Yi boundary that the term presupposes was understood by several classical and later authors as crossable: a state or people that adopted the norms of the Central State(s) could be counted as Hua, and one that abandoned them could be classed with the Yi (夷, conventionally but imperfectly rendered as "barbarian"). Modern scholarship, both Chinese and Western, treats the word as the name of a self-conscious, cross-clan cultural community that emerged during the Spring and Autumn period, rather than as the name of an ethnic group in the modern sense.

Because the compound's best-known citation in Chinese reference works occurs in a chapter of the Book of Documents now generally accepted as a later work, the dating of Huaxia is a topic of active philological discussion. The earliest secure attestation is in the Zuo Zhuan, in a passage set in 546 BCE. The term's transmission history is also unusually wide: from the twelfth century onward, writers in Japan, Korea, and Vietnam adopted the vocabulary of Hua and Xia to make their own claims to civilisational centrality.

== Names and forms ==
裔不謀夏，夷不亂華。

— Confucius, at the conference of Jiagu, 500 BCE, in the Zuo Zhuan, Duke Ding, tenth year. Translation: "The distant do not plot against Xia; the Yi do not disorder Hua."

=== The two characters ===
Hua (華) and Xia (夏) belong to the same Old Chinese rhyme group (魚部) and both have velar or uvular initial consonants. This phonological proximity is the basis of the long-standing argument, associated with Gu Jiegang and Wang Shumin, that Hua was developed as a phonetic variant of Xia in order to "add weight" to the name, a device comparable to other classical disyllabic pairings. Hu Axiang reports Xie Weiyang's formulation that both graphs "belong to the xia initial and yu rhyme, being double alliteration and rhyme, and can be mutually borrowed" (古音夏、華皆屬匣紐魚韻，乃雙聲疊韻，可以互假). A minority philological objection notes that Hua is a second-division (二等) word while Xia is first-division, implying a lost medial in Hua that sound change alone does not explain; the Baxter-Sagart reconstructions, with a *N- prefix and uvular initial for Hua against a plain uvular for Xia, reflect that asymmetry.

Hua carries three readings with distinct meanings, a fact that complicates many popular etymologies: huā (flower), huá (splendid; China), and huà (Mount Hua and the surname Hua). The reading distinction is the principal philological difficulty facing the theory that the ethnonym derives from Mount Hua, since the mountain's name is read huà and not huá.

=== Old Chinese reconstruction ===
In historical Chinese phonology a starred form such as *N-qʷʰˤra is a reconstruction rather than a spelling found in any surviving text, and the symbols used to write it are those of the International Phonetic Alphabet. The standard reconstruction of the two morphemes is that of William H. Baxter and Laurent Sagart (2014), who give Hua as *N-qʷʰˤra and Xia as *[ɢ]ˤraʔ. The character 花, the later and now standard graph for "flower", derives from the same root, 花 huā from *qʷʰˤra; in a 2024 paper Sagart and Baxter revise the reconstruction of 花 to *X.pʰˤra but leave that of 華 unchanged.

=== Pronunciation and the "single word" question ===
Middle Chinese readings and fanqie spellings
Graph	Middle Chinese	Fanqie spelling	Gloss in the Guangyun
華	hwæ (level tone, ma rhyme, xia initial)	戶花切	flower; splendour
夏	hæX (rising tone) and hæH (departing tone)	胡雅切	great; summer; the Central States

Sources frequently state that Hua and Xia "were originally the same word". The more careful position in current Chinese scholarship is that the two were computationally and semantically close (音義近同) and were used interchangeably in classical texts, but that they have separate graph histories and separate attestation patterns, and were not demonstrably one word. The interchangeability is nonetheless directly attested. The Zuo Zhuan records Confucius saying "the borderers may not consult Xia; the Yi do not disorder Hua" (裔不謀夏，夷不亂華), in which Hua and Xia stand in parallel and are generally read as the same referent.

Structurally, Huaxia is a coordinate compound rather than a modifier-head construction such as Zhongguo (中國, "central state(s)"). This is why classical commentators can write that "Hua and Xia are one" (華、夏一也) and why the two morphemes can be substituted for one another within a single sentence. Hu Axiang, following Gu Jiegang, Wang Shumin, and the historical linguist Tong Shuye, identifies three motives for the pairing: prosodic reinforcement; semantic escalation, since Xia already meant "great" and adding Hua allowed the name to express cultural as well as territorial pre-eminence; and the general lexical drift of the period from monosyllables toward disyllables.

=== Related names ===
Names built on the same roots
Term	Trad.	Pinyin	Literal sense	Typical usage
Hua	華	Huá	"splendid", "flowering"	A self-designation of the Central State(s); later a name for China
Xia	夏	Xià	"great", "refined"; also the name of a dynasty	A self-designation of the Zhou polity and its royal domain
Zhuhua	諸華	Zhūhuá	"the various Hua"	The Central State(s) collectively, contrasted with Rong and Di
Zhuxia	諸夏	Zhūxià	"the various Xia"	The most common classical form
Huaxia	華夏	Huáxià	"Hua and Xia"	The compound form; earliest secure attestation 546 BCE
Zhongxia	中夏	Zhōngxià	"central Xia"	A literary synonym for the Central State(s)
Quxia	區夏	Qūxià	"the Xia region"	Western Zhou usage, referring to the Zhou polity
Fangxia	方夏	Fāngxià	"the regions of Xia"	Imperial-era literary usage
Zhongguo	中國	Zhōngguó	"central state(s)"	Initially spatial; later the national name
Zhonghua	中華	Zhōnghuá	"central Hua"	First attested in the early 5th century; the modern civilisational name

== Etymology of Hua ==
=== Flower, and then splendour ===
The Shuowen Jiezi glosses hua as "blossoming" (華，榮也). The Erya distinguishes botanical uses: "that which flowers on a tree is called hua; that which flowers on a grass is called rong" (木謂之華，草謂之榮). The Classic of Poetry uses the graph in this sense, as in "the peach tree young and fair, how brilliant its blossoms" (桃之夭夭，灼灼其華). The modern character for flower, 花, is a later development. Wang Niansun treats hua and huā as ancient and modern forms of the same graph, while Duan Yucai dates the popular form to the Northern Dynasties.

The sense of the ethnonym is taken to be the extended meaning "resplendent, adorned" rather than "flower" literally. Wang Hui, professor at Shaanxi Normal University, argues that Hua originally described the splendid attire of the population of the royal domain, citing the Classic of Poetry portrait of the capital's gentlemen in "fox furs of yellow", "sedge hats and black caps", and "sashes hanging down" (狐裘黃黃、臺笠緇撮、垂帶). On this reading the term began as a description of well-dressed metropolitan people, then extended to the royal domain and finally to the peoples of the Central Plain generally.

=== The Kong gloss and its definition ===
夏，大也。中國有禮儀之大，故稱夏；有服章之美，謂之華。華、夏一也。

— Kong Yingda, Correct Meaning of the Zuo Commentary on the Spring and Autumn Annals, 7th century CE. Translation: "Xia means 'great.' The Central State(s) possess the greatness of ritual propriety, hence are called Xia; they possess the beauty of robes and insignia, hence are called Hua. Hua and Xia are one."

The most widely quoted definition of the two terms is that of the Tang dynasty exegete Kong Yingda (574 to 648 CE), writing in the Correct Meaning of the Zuo Commentary (春秋左傳正義). It rests in turn on the commentary attributed to Kong Anguo, the so-called "Pseudo-Kong Commentary" (偽孔傳), which reads "ceremonial robes and patterned insignia are called Hua; a great state is called Xia" (冕服采章曰華，大國曰夏).

Because this gloss post-dates the term by more than a millennium, scholars treat it as interpretation rather than etymology. Zhang Taiyan observed that to read the name as "splendid" or "civilised" is defensible but not primary, and that the same applies to glossing Xia as "great": "both are later developments" (皆後起之說耳).

=== Competing derivations ===
Proposed etymologies of Hua
Theory	Claim	Principal advocates	Status in current scholarship
Flower, extended to "splendour"	The graph means blossom; the ethnonym uses the extended sense of visible radiance	Shuowen Jiezi; Duan Yucai; Wang Niansun	Accepted at the level of graph meaning; the semantic bridge to an ethnonym remains debated
Mount Hua	The people took their name from the mountain between which they lived	Zhang Taiyan; widely reproduced in popular accounts	Questioned on phonological grounds (huà versus huá) and on period grounds, since Mount Hua was not a prominent cult mountain in the relevant period
The Yangshao "rose"	Hua derives from the flower or petal motif of painted pottery of the Miaodigou type of the Yangshao culture, marking a putative "Hua people"	Su Bingqi and others; frequently repeated in Chinese state media	The archaeology is well established; a "Hua people" is not traceable in pre-Western Zhou texts, graphs, or legend
Kunlun, "flower-land"	Hua derives from a Central Asian place name meaning "flower soil"	Albert Terrien de Lacouperie	Rejected; associated with the discredited theory of a western origin of the Chinese people
Hua as a substitute for Yu	Huaxia stands for Yuxia, the names of the legendary Yu and Xia dynasties	Zhang Fuxiang	Proposed in 2013; not consensus

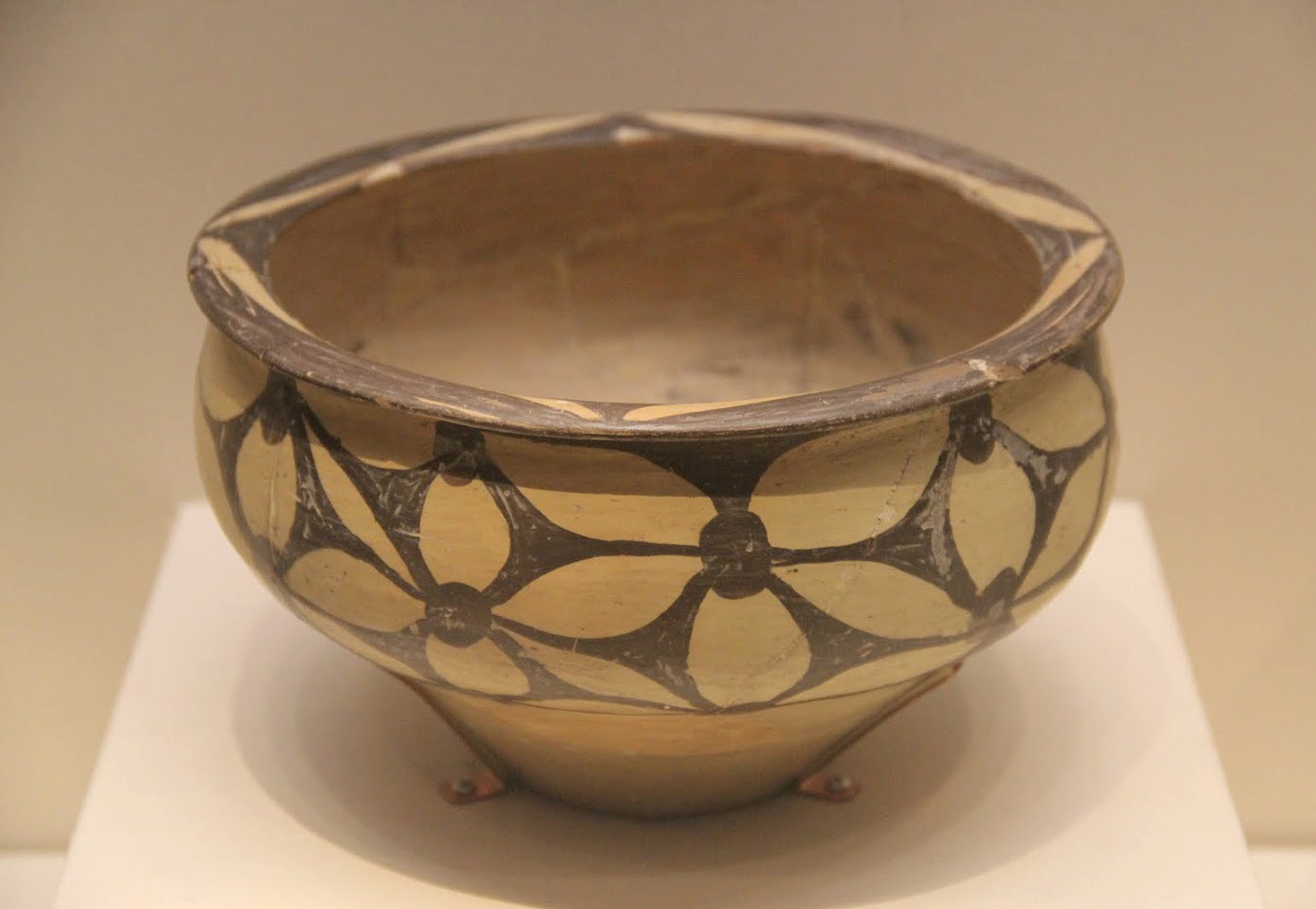
Painted pottery basin of the Miaodigou type, Yangshao culture, excavated in 1956 at Shanxian, Henan. The petal pattern is the motif that Su Bingqi associated with the character Hua; the object itself, however, does not attest the word.

Su Bingqi's 1985 quatrain, "Mount Hua's rose, Yanshan's dragon; below the great blue mountains, the jia and the weng; beside the Fen River bend, the chime-stone and the drum; Xia, Shang, Zhou, and Lord Wen of Jin", synthesised regional archaeological cultures rather than textual evidence. The painted pottery of the Miaodigou type, dated to roughly 6000 to 5500 years before present, is distributed from the Yin Mountains in the north to the Yangtze in the south, from the sea in the east to Gansu and Qinghai in the west, and its petal motifs are its most distinctive feature.

The Kunlun theory was refuted by Zhang Taiyan on evidentiary grounds: "That Kunlun was the Hua country is inferred by analogy from unrelated matters; whether the ancient rulers of China ever dwelt at Kunlun has no clear warrant in the histories, and it cannot serve as evidence" (世言崑崙為華國者，特以他事比擬得之……不足引以為質). Hu Axiang adds that the water name Hua on which some versions of the theory rest is unattested in pre-Qin texts.

== Etymology of Xia ==
=== The graph ===
Sima Qian, writing in the Han period, states that Xia was the name of the state enfeoffed to the legendary king Yu the Great, and that Yu's descendants took the state as a surname: "Yu was of the Si surname; his descendants were enfeoffed, and used the state as their surname" (禹爲姒姓，其後分封，用國爲姓).

The Shuowen Jiezi defines Xia as "a person of the Central State(s)" (夏，中國之人也) and analyses it as composed of elements representing a head, two hands, and two feet. Duan Yucai's commentary adds that the word served "to distinguish [the Chinese] from the northern Di, the northeastern Mo, the southern Man and Min, the western Qiang, the southwestern Jiaorao, and the eastern Yi", and that "Xia in the extended sense means 'great'".

The received analysis is not the palaeographic picture. The Chinese University of Hong Kong's Multi-function Chinese Character Database summarises the mainstream position: "oracle-bone and bronze forms are both composed of ri (sun) and ye (a human figure with prominent head), depicting a man beneath the sun lifting his head to see it, expressing intense heat; the primary sense is the hot summer day. In oracle-bone divination records the graph is used as a diviner's name." The database notes that early Spring and Autumn bronze forms from Qin omit the sun element and add hand-shaped strokes; that a reading of the Qin form as depicting a dancer's posture and identifying it with the rain-petition dance yu (雩) was proposed by Dai Junren and is considered unreliable by Tang Yuhui; and that in the bronze inscription of the Qin Gong gui the graph denotes Huaxia as a name for the Central State(s) and their people.

The absence of Xia and Hua as ethnic or geographic terms from Shang oracle-bone records is matched by the absence there of the terms for the four barbarian categories. Wang Hui observes that Shang divination names hostile polities with the suffix fang (方), as in Qiang fang and Ren fang, and never with Yi or Di, and that the two silences are mutually consistent. The Bamboo Annals reference to nine eastern Yi groups in the reign of the Xia ruler Fen is, on this view, a Warring States projection rather than a Xia-period self-description.

=== Xia as "refined": the Xia and Ya equivalence ===
譬之越人安越，楚人安楚，君子安雅。

— Xunzi, "Honour and Disgrace". Translation: "Just as the man of Yue is at ease in Yue, and the man of Chu at ease in Chu, so the gentleman is at ease in Ya."

A major line of interpretation holds that the primary sense of Xia as an ethnonym is "refined" or "correct", that is, the speech, music, and bearing of the royal domain, written in other contexts as ya (雅). The classical warrant is Wang Yinzhi's reading, "Ya is read as Xia; Xia means the Central State(s)" (雅讀為夏，夏謂中國也).

Two passages of the Xunzi establish the equivalence in parallel: "dwell in Chu and be Chu; dwell in Yue and be Yue; dwell in Xia and be Xia" (居楚而楚，居越而越，居夏而夏), and, in the neighbouring chapter, "the gentleman is at ease in Ya".

Documentary confirmation comes from excavated manuscripts. The Bamboo Texts of Guodian Ziyi chapter quotes the Classic of Poetry "Greater Ya" four times and writes ya as xia on every occasion; the Shanghai Museum bamboo slips, volume one, containing the "Confucius on the Poetry" and Ziyi texts, likewise writes "Greater Ya" and "Lesser Ya" as "Greater Xia" and "Lesser Xia". The music-criticism episode in the Zuo Zhuan, in which Ji Zha of Wu hears the odes of Qin and remarks "this is what is called the Xia sound; he who can be Xia will become great" (此之謂夏聲。夫能夏則大), points the same way. The Shuowen also records that the graph denotes a type of ancient music later written ya.

=== Other proposals ===
Proposed etymologies of Xia
Theory	Claim	Principal advocates	Status
The Xia dynasty	The ethnonym derives from the name of the first dynastic house	The plurality view among current scholars	Widely held
"Great"	Xia is simply the adjective, applied by extension to the realm and its people	Erya, "Shi Gu"; Duan Yucai	Attested but described by Zhang Taiyan as a later development
"Refined", i.e. ya	Xia names correct speech and bearing, and the music and poetry of the royal domain	Wang Yinzhi; developed by Wang Hui	Supported by Qin bronze, Chu manuscript, Xunzi, and Zuo Zhuan evidence
The Xia River (the Han River)	The people were named for the river	Zhang Taiyan	Refuted by Meng Wentong, who dates the river name to after the reign of King Zhuang of Chu, too late to name a people
The xia di pheasant	The place name came from an abundance of the long-tailed pheasant called xia di, hence the polity's name	Niu Ruchen	A minority reconstruction based on Yu Gong, Kong Yingda, and Xu Kai
Summer, the season	The season word became a polity name	Miscellaneous	Not demonstrated

== Earliest attestations ==
=== The Wucheng attribution ===
Traditional accounts of the term's origin point to the Wucheng chapter of the Book of Documents, which contains the line "the Hua-Xia and the Man and Mo, none did not follow and obey" (華夏蠻貊，罔不率俾). The Wucheng chapter, however, belongs to the twenty-five "forged Old Text" (偽古文) chapters of the received Book of Documents, which surfaced during the Eastern Jin dynasty in the fourth century CE together with a commentary attributed to Kong Anguo. Doubt was raised in the Song dynasty by Wu Yu and Zhu Xi, developed in the Ming by Mei Zhuo in his Investigation of Discrepancies in the Book of Documents, and established in the Qing by Yan Ruoqu's Critical Examination of the Old Text Book of Documents, which advanced 128 arguments, and by Hui Dong's Examination of the Old Text Book of Documents. Liang Qichao described Yan Ruoqu as "the first hero of the last three centuries' intellectual liberation" and credited the campaign against the forged Book of Documents with inaugurating the Qing fashion for textual doubt.

One of Yan Ruoqu's arguments concerns the Wucheng chapter specifically. The genuine Wucheng was lost by the Eastern Han; fragments survive only as quoted by Liu Xin in the Santong calendar as preserved in the Book of Han treatise on the calendar, in three separated blocks. Yan Ruoqu observed that the forger appears to have seen only the first block and stitched it into the new chapter, leaving the second and third unaccounted for. A related problem is chronological: the forged chapter ascribes to King Wu a "nine years" reckoning that does not cohere with the received chronology of the conquest.

Wang Hui draws the conclusion explicitly: because Huaxia occurs in the forged Wucheng, "there was probably no term Huaxia in the Western Zhou; it must have appeared only in the Spring and Autumn period" (西周時大概還沒有「華夏」一詞。它應是在春秋時才出現).

=== Secure attestations ===
The earliest secure attestation of the compound is in the Zuo Zhuan, at Duke Xiang, twenty-sixth year, a passage set in 546 BCE. Cai Shengzi, advising the Chu chief minister, recounts a diplomatic reverse:

晉遂侵蔡，襲沈，獲其君，敗申、息之師於桑隧，獲申麗而還，鄭於是乎不敢南面。楚失華夏，則析公之為也。

— Zuo Zhuan, Duke Xiang, 26th year. Translation: "Jin then invaded Cai, made a surprise attack on Shen and captured its ruler, defeated the armies of Shen and Xi at Sang Sui, captured Shen Li and returned; Zheng thereupon did not dare to turn south. That Chu lost the Huaxia was the work of Xi Gong."

Here Huaxia refers to the Central Plain states collectively, and the passage is a statement about the loss of political influence over them. Niu Ruchen notes that a minority of Chinese works instead cite 547 BCE for this passage, since the twenty-sixth year of Duke Xiang corresponds on some reckonings to that year; the discrepancy is conventional rather than substantive.

The individual forms Hua, Zhuhua, Xia, and Zhuxia are all earlier and considerably more frequent. The following table collects the principal passages, arranged by the internal date of the events described.

Attestations in the classical corpus
Text and locus	Internal date	Passage	Sense
Zuo Zhuan, Duke Min, 1st year	661 BCE	戎狄豺狼，不可厭也；諸夏親暱，不可棄也。	Guan Zhong to Duke Huan of Qi: the Rong and Di are jackals and wolves, never to be sated; the various Xia are our close kin, not to be abandoned
Zuo Zhuan, Duke Xi, 21st year	639 BCE	……以服事諸夏……蠻夷猾夏，周禍也。	The Feng-surnamed small states "served the various Xia"; "the Man and Yi disrupt Xia: a calamity for Zhou"
Zuo Zhuan, Duke Cheng, 4th year	587 BCE	史佚之志有之曰：非我族類，其心必異。	"The record of Scribe Yi says: for those not of our kind, their minds must differ"
Zuo Zhuan, Duke Xiang, 4th year	569 BCE	諸華必叛 / 獲戎失華，無乃不可乎	Wei Jiang to Duke Dao of Jin: "the various Hua will surely revolt"; "to gain the Rong and lose the Hua, is that not impermissible?"
Zuo Zhuan, Duke Xiang, 11th year	562 BCE	子教寡人和諸戎狄，以正諸華。	Duke Dao of Jin to Wei Jiang: "you taught me to pacify the various Rong and Di, so as to set the various Hua right"
Zuo Zhuan, Duke Xiang, 14th year	559 BCE	我諸戎飲食衣服不與華同，贄幣不通，言語不達。	The Rong chief Ju Zhi: "we various Rong differ from the Hua in food and clothing; our gifts and tokens do not pass between us; our speech is not mutually intelligible"
Zuo Zhuan, Duke Xiang, 26th year	546 BCE	楚失華夏	Earliest secure attestation of the compound
Zuo Zhuan, Duke Xiang, 29th year	544 BCE	此之謂夏聲。夫能夏則大……	Ji Zha of Wu on the music of Qin: "this is what is called the Xia sound"
Zuo Zhuan, Duke Zhao, 30th year	512 BCE	吳，周之胄裔也……今而始大，比於諸華。	Zixi of Chu on Wu: a Zhou descendant "now grown great, ranked with the various Hua"
Zuo Zhuan, Duke Ding, 10th year	500 BCE	裔不謀夏，夷不亂華，兵不逼好。	Confucius at the conference of Jiagu
Analects, 3.5	5th century BCE	夷狄之有君，不如諸夏之亡也。	"The Yi and Di, though they have rulers, are not the equal of the various Xia even when they have none"
Analects, 14.17	5th century BCE	微管仲，吾其被髮左衽矣。	"But for Guan Zhong, we would be wearing our hair loose and our robes fastened to the left"
Gongyang Zhuan, Duke Cheng, 15th year	575 BCE	《春秋》……內諸夏而外夷狄。	"The Spring and Autumn treats the various Xia as inner and the Yi-Di as outer"
Gongyang Zhuan, Duke Ai, 13th year	482 BCE	不與夷狄之主中國也。	On the Huangchi covenant: "because it does not grant the Yi-Di mastery of the Central State(s)"
Book of Documents, "Shun Dian"	archaic strata	蠻夷猾夏，寇賊姦宄。	"The Man and Yi disorder Xia"; the Pseudo-Kong commentary glosses Xia as Huaxia
Book of Rites, "Wang Zhi"	Han recension	中國戎夷，五方之民，皆有性也，不可推移。	"The Central State(s) and the Rong and Yi, the peoples of the five directions, each have their nature, which cannot be shifted"

Two features of the distribution are worth noting. First, Zhuxia and Zhuhua are the ordinary words of the period; Huaxia itself is comparatively rare. Second, almost every occurrence stands in explicit opposition to the Rong, Di, Yi, or Man, or arises in a passage about alliance, migration, or war. The Jin commentator Du Yu, glossing both forms, explains Zhuxia as "the central state(s)" (諸夏中國也) and Zhuhua as "the central state(s)" (諸華中國).

Yan Shian of Nanjing University argues that this is not incidental: the appearance of Zhuxia marks the point at which the ancient Huaxia community moved "from gestation to birth", and represents the first appearance in Chinese history of a cross-clan ethnic consciousness, since the group it names was a combination of differently-surnamed clans from east and west rather than an older style clan league.

=== Western Zhou usage: Xia before Huaxia ===
The Zhou used Xia of themselves well before the compound existed. Wang Hui collects the principal passages: "thus [King Wen] began to create our Quxia" (用肇造我區夏) in the Kang Gao; "there was Xia" (有夏) in the Jun Shi and Li Zheng; and "this Xia" (時夏) in the Zhou Song sections "Si Wen" and "Shi Mai". The syntax indicates that Quxia is an inversion equivalent to "the Xia region", and that Youxia and Shixia are likewise forms meaning "the Xia". Wang Hui's reconstruction is that these terms designated first the pre-conquest alliance zone of Kings Wen and Wu, and then the royal domain of the early Zhou.

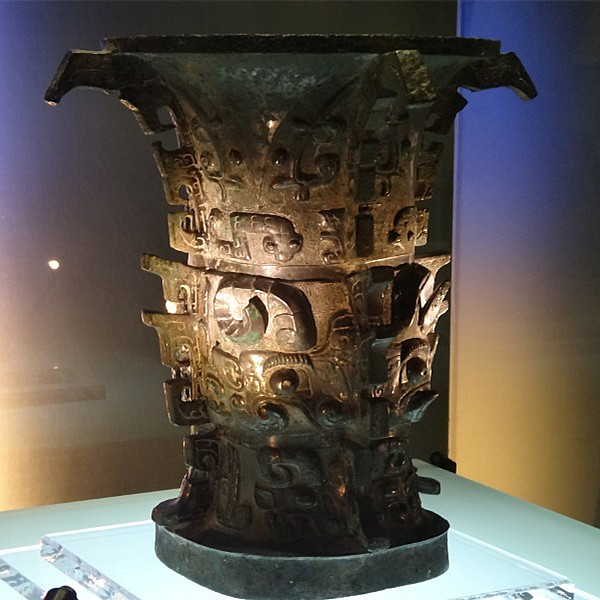
The He zun, Baoji Bronzeware Museum. The vessel's 122 graph inscription is the earliest known written occurrence of the phrase Zhongguo.

The earliest epigraphic attestation of Zhongguo, a related but distinct term, is on the He zun, a bronze vessel cast in the fifth year of King Cheng of Zhou and discovered in 1963 at Baoji, Shaanxi. Its 122-graph inscription contains the phrase "I shall dwell in this Zhongguo, and from here govern the people" (余其宅茲中或，自之乂民). In the inscription, Zhongguo appears to refer to the immediate domain of the conquered Shang dynasty that the Zhou had taken over. Yu Xingwu's Shi Zhongguo established the vessel as the earliest evidence for the phrase, and the discovery is regularly cited in Chinese public discourse as the origin of the national name.

=== Bronze and manuscript evidence for Xia as an ethnonym ===
The most important bronze witness to Xia in an ethnic sense is the Qin Gong gui, a vessel in the National Museum of China, probably cast in the reign of Duke Jing of Qin (r. 576 to 537 BCE) on the majority view of Guo Moruo, Tang Lan, and Zhang Zhenglang. Its inscription reads in part:

秦公曰：丕顯朕皇祖受天命，鼏宅禹迹，十又二公，在帝之坯。嚴，恭夤天命，保業厥秦，虩事蠻夏。

— Qin Gong gui inscription. Translation: "The Duke of Qin says: gloriously, my august ancestors received Heaven's mandate, settling the traces of Yu; twelve dukes have dwelt beside the Di. Solemnly, reverently obeying Heaven's mandate, safeguarding the enterprise of Qin, in awe they served the Man and the Xia."

A related Qin bell set from Taigongmiao village, discovered in 1978, reads "thus in awe they served the Man regions" (以虩事蠻方), while the stone chimes from Duke Jing's tomb read "he began to spread rule over Man and Xia, and they all served Qin" (肇敷蠻夏，極事于秦).

Chao Fulin of Beijing Normal University reads the Taigongmiao phrase, which he transcribes with the graph for "interstice", as describing Qin acting between Man and Xia, and argues that contemporaries regarded Qin as "neither Zhongguo nor Yidi, but intermediate", a "great Yi" position that he treats as an important stage in the formation of the Chinese nation.

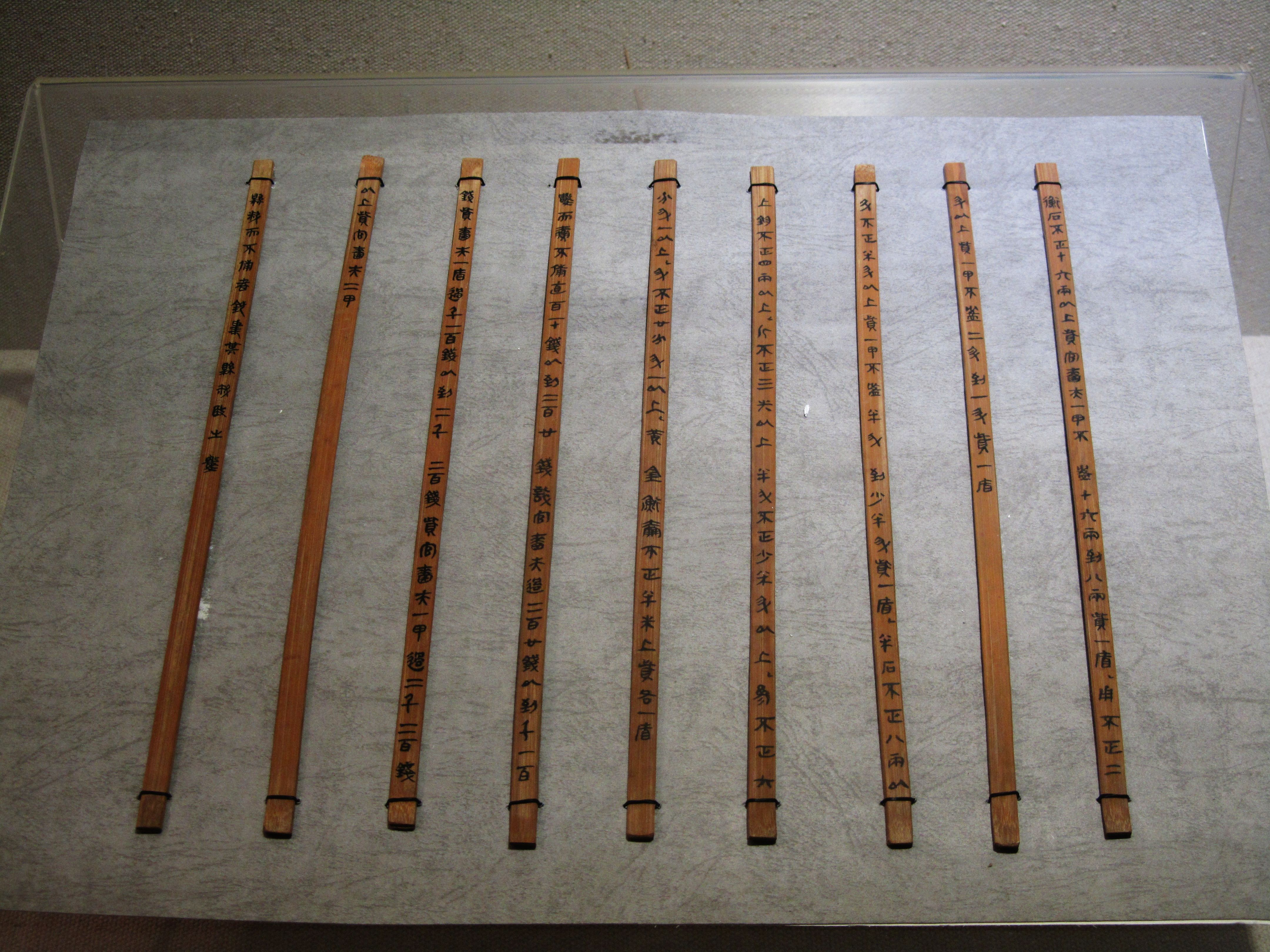
Bamboo slips from the Shuihudi Qin tomb, Yunmeng, Hubei, found in 1975. The texts use Xia as an administrative category of belonging.

An unexpected attestation comes from the Shuihudi Qin bamboo texts of the third century BCE, where Xia functions as an administrative and legal category rather than a rhetorical one. The dependent polities of the Qin state are called Xia; to leave them is "to depart from Xia" (去夏); and the child of a dependent-state man and a Qin woman is a "Xia child" (夏子). Zhang Zhenglang took this to indicate that Qin regarded itself as Zhongguo, with its subordinate polities falling under Xia.

== Meaning: ritual, dress, speech, and descent ==
Zhou dynasty cosmography: Huaxia at the centre, ringed by the Four Barbarians.

=== Three layers ===
Chinese scholarship conventionally distinguishes three overlapping layers in the classical use of the term.

Layers of meaning
Layer	Content	Characteristic vocabulary
Geographic	The middle and lower Yellow River, the Central Plain, the royal domains	中原, 中夏, 中土
Political and genealogical	The states enfeoffed by Zhou, "brothers" and "nephews" of the royal house, bound by covenant and marriage	諸夏 as kin-states; the exclusion of Wu despite its Zhou lineage
Cultural and normative	Ritual propriety, correct speech, proper attire, classical music, and canonical learning	禮, 服章, 雅, 夏聲

Charles Holcombe characterises the earliest sense in a widely quoted formulation: "Initially, Huaxia seems to have been a somewhat elastic cultural marker, referring neither to race nor ethnicity nor any particular country but rather to 'civilized,' settled, literate, agricultural populations adhering to common ritual standards, in contrast to 'barbarians.'"

The three layers do not coincide, and the friction between them is what made the vocabulary productive. A state could be genealogically Zhou and be criticised as culturally barbarous; conversely, states of non-Zhou origin such as Chu and Qin could be counted as Hua by adopting the relevant norms. Wang Zhenzhong of the Chinese Academy of Social Sciences argues that the names carried a cultural premium precisely for this reason: "Xia may be glossed as Zhongguo, as 'great', and as ya; Hua in the ancient texts chiefly means 'patterned' and 'splendid', which is entirely the same as the 'refined' sense of Xia. Both point to the dress, ritual, and institutional civilisation of the Central Plain."

=== The convertibility doctrine ===
Several classical and later authorities treat the Hua-Yi boundary as crossable in both directions.

孔子之作《春秋》也，諸侯用夷禮則夷之，進於中國則中國之。

— Han Yu, Yuan Dao (On the Origin of the Way), 9th century CE. Translation: "In composing the Spring and Autumn, Confucius treated a feudal lord who used Yi rites as a Yi; one who advanced into the norms of the Central State(s) he treated as of the Central State(s)."

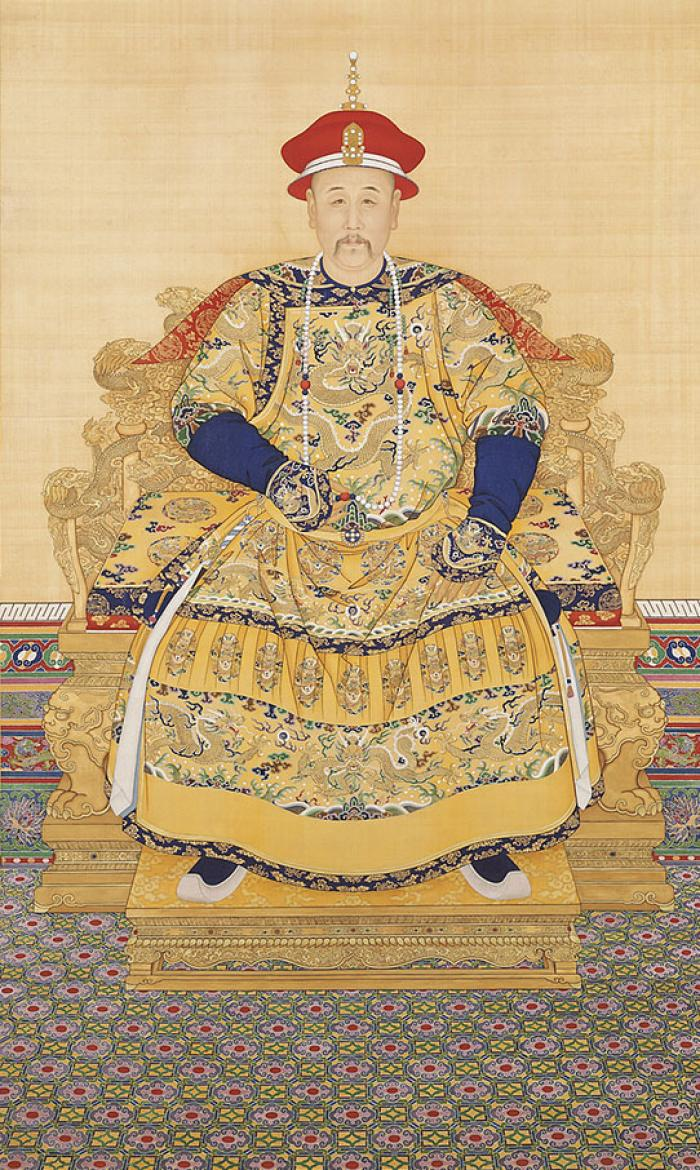
The Yongzheng Emperor (r. 1722 to 1735), whose published argument with the scholar Zeng Jing redefined the Hua-Yi distinction as one without fixed spatial or ethnic content.

The Qing Yongzheng Emperor deployed the same logic in the Dayi Juemi Lu (1730), a published refutation of the anti-Manchu arguments of Lü Liuliang and Zeng Jing. Yongzheng argued that the Hua-Yi distinction "cannot be spoken of in terms of place; and even if spoken of in terms of place, it has no fixed limit" (華夷之辨固不可以地言，即以地言，亦無定限), that "this dynasty's being Manchu is like a Chinese person's having a native place" (本朝之為滿洲，猶中國之有籍貫), and that "since our dynasty entered as masters of the Central Land and rules all under Heaven, and even the far Mongol tribes have entered the realm, China's territory has been vastly extended, a great fortune for China's subjects. How can there still be talk of dividing Hua from Yi, inner from outer?" (何得尚有華夷中外之分論哉). Zeng Jing, whose position had been that "the Hua-Yi distinction is greater than the bond of ruler and minister", was defeated in argument and wrote a recantation, the Gui Ren Shuo. Han Dongyu of Northeast Normal University reads the arc from the Dayi Juemi Lu to the 1912 abdication edict of the Xuantong Emperor as the construction of a "greater China" that includes non-Han worlds.

=== The Western scholarly debate ===
Western sinology has contested how much "ethnicity" the vocabulary actually encodes.

Yuri Pines argues, in "Beasts or Humans: Pre-Imperial Origins of the Sino-Barbarian Dichotomy" (2005), that in pre-imperial China the fundamental line between self and other ran through ritual norms rather than descent; that the dichotomy was "cultural-inclusive rather than racial-exclusive"; and that the differences it marked "cannot be named 'racial'; they referred to a behavioral pattern, which could be learned or modified with proper upbringing".

Nicola Di Cosmo, in Ancient China and Its Enemies (2002), doubts the existence of a strong demarcation between a "Zhou universe" and a discrete non-Zhou one, and remarks that "it is impossible to translate the word barbarian into Chinese because the concept does not exist in Chinese", meaning that the Chinese terms do not map onto the Greco-Roman barbaros. Gideon Shelach argues that Chinese texts systematically overstated the distinction between the Central State(s) and their northern neighbours and ignored intergroup similarities. Pamela Kyle Crossley challenges Pines's reading of Mencius on the transformability of barbarians into sages.

The practical consequence in current scholarly practice is that Yi, Di, Rong, and Man are increasingly left untranslated in specialist writing rather than rendered as "barbarian".

== Formation of the Huaxia community ==
The emergence of the term is generally explained as the intersection of three processes that peaked in the Spring and Autumn period.

Li Feng argues that during the Western Zhou the contrast between the "Chinese" and the non-Chinese Xirong or Dongyi was "more political than cultural or ethnic". Lothar von Falkenhausen argues that the perceived contrast was accentuated during the Eastern Zhou, when adherence to Zhou rituals came to be recognised as a "barometer of civilisation". It is widely agreed that the distinction between Hua and Yi emerged during that period.

First, Zhou legitimism was re-coded as "Xia". The Zhou had used Xia as the style of their own coalition and royal domain, as in Quxia, Youxia, and Shixia. As Zhou power declined, the name became a legacy that states could invoke, inherit, or be accused of betraying. Yan Shian emphasises that the Zhou's use of Xia named themselves alone, without the composite sense that Huaxia later acquired.

Second, sustained conflict with mobile pastoral and semi-pastoral populations along the northern and western margins generated a politics of alliance. Wu Xiaolong describes Huaxia identity as having arisen in the Eastern Zhou as a reaction to intensified conflict with the Rong and Di, who migrated into Zhou lands and extinguished several Zhou states. The response was the programme of the hegemon: "honour the king, repel the barbarians" (尊王攘夷). Guan Zhong's words to Duke Huan of Qi in 661 BCE are usually treated as the founding statement of the position: "the Rong and Di are jackals and wolves, never to be sated; the various Xia are our close kin, not to be abandoned". Wang Mingke, a historian and anthropologist at Academia Sinica and later Peking University, argues that pastoral, armed, and mobile populations competed for resources along an ecological frontier, that the Central Plain polities responded with covenants and with the rhetoric of repelling the barbarians, and that Huaxia identity and the "Huaxia frontier" emerged as a mutually constitutive pair. His study of that frontier treats the periphery, rather than the centre, as the analytically decisive object.

Modern historiography also places the consolidation of Huaxia self-awareness in the Warring States period (475 to 221 BCE), when a Huaxia nationality is said to have grown out of the Xia, Shang, and Zhou populations of the middle and upper Yellow River, with the Han evolving from the Huaxia in turn. Ebrey and Walthall argue that the Han dynasty's creation of a persistent Han ethnocultural identity further fixed the distinction between the refined Hua and the increasingly marginalised Yi.

Third, a ritual community with a shared canon coalesced. Yan Shian's formulation is that "Zhuxia was a new kind of ethnic concept, not an old-style clan league but a combination of differently-surnamed clans from east and west; it marks the first appearance in Chinese history of a cross-clan ethnic consciousness", and that its appearance marks the ancient Huaxia people's movement from gestation to birth. Wang Zhenzhong's related argument, from the perspective of state structure, is that the Xia polity was already a "composite state" consisting of a royal capital domain together with subordinate polities, and that ethnic formation begins with it.

A caution is regularly entered against reading the resulting narrative as straightforwardly continuous. Zhang Fuxiang of Shandong University argues that the received histories, above all the Book of Documents, the Shiben, and the Bamboo Annals, are structured by a "Huaxia historiography" (華夏史觀) that absorbed and reordered older and originally separate clan histories. His example is that the Shang and Zhou, of different ancestral lines, are both made sons of Emperor Ku and both ministers of Emperor Shun in the received "Shun Dian". On this view Huaxia is both a historical community and a historiographical achievement, and accounts that preserve only one of those two aspects are incomplete.

== Imperial and medieval usage ==
After the Qin and Han unifications, the political function of the vocabulary changed. There was no longer a plurality of Zhuxia states to distinguish from the Rong and Di, but an empire and a frontier, and the term migrated accordingly. It appears as a synonym for the realm, as in "Fangxia broke into chaos, the imperial capital was smoke and dust" (方夏崩沸，皇京煙埃) in the Book of the Later Han biography of Dong Zhuo, where Li Xian's Tang commentary explains "fang means the four directions; Xia means Huaxia" (方，四方；夏，華夏也). It appears as a rhetorical heightening of a general's renown, as in the Records of the Three Kingdoms notice that Guan Yu's "prestige shook Huaxia" (羽威震華夏). The compound Zhonghua is first attested in Pei Songzhi's commentary to the same work, and later appears in a Tang poem by Han Wo set against "foreign lands": "the land of Zhonghua ends at the border cities; the clouds of foreign countries come from beyond the islands" (中華地向邊城盡，外國雲從島上來).

The decisive test of the vocabulary's flexibility came during the fourth to sixth centuries, when non-Han dynasties ruled northern China, and again under the Liao, Western Xia, Jin, Yuan, and Qing. In each case the name proved transferable. Xiongnu, Xianbei, Di, Qiang, and Jie rulers claimed Zhongguo ("Central State"/"Middle Kingdom") and patronised the classical order; the Xiongnu were even able to invoke Sima Qian's claim that "the Xiongnu were descendants of the Xia house" (匈奴，其先祖夏后氏之苗裔) as a genealogical warrant. The Liao, Western Xia, and Jin created scripts based on Chinese writing, patronised Confucian learning, and claimed Zhongguo or "Northern Court" status against the Song as "Southern Court".

Joseph Esherick argues that the process by which the Qing came to be identified with "China" is itself a case of the term's transferability, in which a conquest dynasty acquired the name rather than being excluded from it. Shi Jie similarly treats the integration of Han and non-Han under the empire as a process of mutual incorporation rather than simple assimilation.

The names also remained available for internal political argument. The Ming founder's 1367 proclamation to the north used the formula "drive out the Hu caitiffs, restore Zhonghua, establish the norms and laws, succour the people" (驅逐胡虜，恢復中華，立綱陳紀，救濟斯民). The Tongmenghui oath of 1905 reused the same cadence with substitutions: "drive out the Manchu caitiffs, restore Zhonghua, found a republic, equalise land rights" (驅除韃虜，恢復中華，創立民國，平均地權). Under the Qing, the same vocabulary served simultaneously as the principal vehicle of anti-dynastic argument and as a vehicle for the dynasty's own defence, as the exchange between Yongzheng and Zeng Jing demonstrates.

== Outside China: Japan, Korea, and Vietnam ==
The civilisational order built on the Hua-Yi distinction presupposed a centre that generated wen (文, culture, pattern, refinement). Because the criteria were cultural rather than genealogical, the logic was portable: any polity possessing the rites, the canon, the correct dress, and the classical language could claim to be Hua, and in extremis could argue that the nominal centre had forfeited the name. Between the twelfth and nineteenth centuries, writers in Japan, Korea, and Vietnam did exactly this, producing the family of claims known as "lesser Zhonghua" (小中華), the "metamorphosis of Hua and Yi" (華夷變態), and the "central court" (中朝).

=== Japan ===
Japanese court documents use Zhongguo and Huaxia for Japan itself from the Nara period. Examples include "it was then that intercourse with Zhongguo began" (通中國於是始矣) and "Huaxia awaits" (華夏載佇), and the notice that "Silla does not serve Zhongguo" (新羅不事中國). A memorial by Fujiwara no Hirotsugu in the eighth century applies the full four-barbarian frame to Japan's own frontiers: "the northern Di, the Ezo; the western Rong, the Hayato, by nature wolfish and easily disordered, their wild hearts hard to tame... when there is a sage in Zhongguo they submit afterwards, and when the court is disturbed they rebel first".

After the Mongol invasions of Japan, and especially after the Ming-Qing transition, Japanese writers began to argue that China had forfeited the name. The Hayashi family's Huayi Biantai ("The Metamorphosis of Hua and Yi", 1672) held that under the Qing, and specifically because of the tonsure and dress edicts, "the cultural goods of Zhonghua are utterly gone" and "the robes of the former kings have become theatrical costume". Yamaga Sokō's Chūchō Jijitsu ("The Facts of the Central Court", 1669) went further, arguing that Japan is the "central court" and "Zhonghua", while the China of geography is the "outer court". His argument was structural rather than racial: the Japanese imperial line was unbroken, whereas the outer court had repeatedly fallen to barbarians and to usurpers.

=== Korea ===
The Korean case is the classic "lesser Zhonghua", a claim to be the faithful heir rather than the centre. An edict of Injong of Goryeo ordered subjects to "revere and practise the law of Huaxia, and strictly prohibit the customs of the Dan and Di" (景行華夏之法，切禁丹狄之俗). The Veritable Records of the Joseon Dynasty contain the characteristic formulations: "our East, since Jizi, has had great moral transformation; the histories call it lesser Zhonghua" (吾東方自箕子以來，教化大行……史稱小中華), from the Annals of King Seongjong, and "dress, caps, culture, and institutions all follow the Hua system" (衣冠文物，一從華制), from the Annals of King Seonjo. Seo Geo-jeong's Dongguk Tonggam makes the claim programmatically. After 1644, Joseon Confucians argued that the civilisational mandate had migrated to Korea, since China was under barbarian rule and Korea preserved the true Huaxia.

=== Vietnam ===
After independence from direct Ming rule in 1428, the Vietnamese court maintained a double register, using "emperor" (皇帝) internally and toward Champa, the Khmer, and the Lao, and "king" (國王) toward the Chinese court, while acting as the centre of a Hua-Yi order in Southeast Asia. In 1300, Trần Anh Tông's proclamation to his generals asked: "you are generals of Zhongguo, yet you stand in attendance on barbarian chiefs without indignation?" (汝等……為中國之將，侍立夷酋，而無忿心), where Zhongguo means Vietnam. Nineteenth-century Nguyễn rhetoric is uncompromising: Gia Long on the Khmer, "Han and Yi have their limits" (漢夷有限), and on Europeans, "the former kings ordered the world so that Xia does not mix with Yi; this is truly the intent of stopping things at the bud" (先王經理天下，夏不雜夷，此誠杜漸防微之意也).

The best-known episode involves the envoy Lý Văn Phức, who in 1831 objected to a hostel in Fujian bearing the sign "Vietnamese Barbarians' Hostel" (越夷會館) and set out his reasoning in an eight hundred word protest titled Bian Yi (辯夷, "Argument against Yi"). It argued that the Vietnamese had long been instructed in the sages' teaching and were possessed of letters and ritual, and were therefore Hua rather than Yi.

== Modern period ==
=== Republican-era debate, 1902 to 1912 ===
The classical vocabulary was re-sorted for modern political purposes in the first decade of the twentieth century. In 1902 Liang Qichao, writing in "The General Trend of Changes in Chinese Academic Thought", became the first to use the term Zhonghua minzu (中華民族, "the Chinese nation") in print. Liang had introduced Zhongguo minzu the previous year in his "Outline of Chinese History", and in 1905 he argued in "An Observation of the Chinese Nation in History" that "the Chinese nation was from the beginning not one clan; it was in fact formed by the mixture of many peoples" (中華民族自始本非一族，實由多民族混合而成). His periodisation of Chinese history into "China's China", "Asia's China", and "the world's China" made the nation the subject of history in a new way.

In 1907 Zhang Taiyan published "An Explanation of the Republic of China" in Minbao, the paper of the Tongmenghui. His opening move was restrictive: "Hua is properly the name of a state, not a title for a race; but in this age it has become common speech. To speak properly of race, one should use the name Xia" (華本國名，非種族之號……正言種族，宜就夏稱). He derived Xia from the Xia River, identified Hua, Xia, and Han as three names that "each mutually contain the three senses" (華云、夏云、漢云，隨舉一名，互攝三義), and concluded that naming the state Hua and the people Han matched the requirements of the new republic: "establish the name Han for the clan, and the sense of state is present; establish the name Hua for the state, and the sense of race is also present. This is why the Republic of China is so named" (建漢名以為族，而邦國之義斯在。建華名以為國，而種族之義亦在。此中華民國之所以諡).

The essay also contains the sentence most often quoted in modern discussions of the term: "Zhongguo is what distinguishes inner from outer by distance of place; Zhonghua is what distinguishes Hua from Yi by relative height of culture. On this view the term Zhonghua is not a name for a country of one territory, nor a racial name of one bloodline, but a cultural name for a people" (中國云者，以中外別地域之遠近也；中華云者，以華夷別文化之高下也。即此以言，則中華之名詞，不僅非一地域之國名，亦且非一血統之種名，乃為一文化之族名). This passage is introduced by the words "now, one who propounds the Doctrine of Gold and Iron says" (今有為金鐵主義說者曰), and so it reports the position of Yang Du, author of the 1907 tract "On the Doctrine of Gold and Iron", which Zhang then rebuts: he objects that if Zhonghua were purely cultural, then "any man with culture would be Chinese, and every farmer, noble, and sage would be an Indian" (縱今華有文化之義，豈得曰凡有文化者盡為中國人乎). The sequence, in which Yang Du published the culturalist formulation and Zhang Taiyan wrote to refute it, is confirmed in Gan Chunsong's study of the debate among Zhang Taiyan, Liang Qichao, and Yang Du.

=== Nation-building, 1939 to 1988 ===
In 1939, during the war with Japan, Gu Jiegang published "The Chinese Nation Is One", which argued that the Chinese nation is an integral whole and that the received divisions obscured a long history of fusion. Fei Xiaotong, then twenty-nine years old and recently returned from study in Britain, expressed reservations in anthropological terms about the loss of concern for cultural, linguistic, and physical diversity; Ma Rong later observed that the disagreement between the two men turned on the definition of "nation", Gu's sense approaching the political nation and Fei's the ethnic group.

Half a century later, in 1988, Fei published "The Pluralistic Unity of the Chinese Nation", which became the mainstream Chinese formulation. His account of the ancient period gives Huaxia the role of core: "in these three thousand years the Yellow River basin saw the emergence of a core formed by the convergence and gradual fusion of several ethnic groups. This core was called Huaxia. Like a rolling snowball it grew larger and larger, absorbing surrounding alien peoples into itself." He distinguished a "self-existing" (自在) ethnic entity formed over several millennia from a "self-aware" (自覺) one produced by the confrontation with Western powers in the preceding century.

=== Contemporary usage ===
In January 2013 the State Council approved the construction of the Huaxia Civilization Inheritance and Innovation Zone in Gansu, described in official materials as a national development platform with culture as its theme, with the stated aim of addressing "the region's status as economically underdeveloped while rich in cultural resources". The zone's fourteenth five-year plan organises work around "exploring origins", "casting the soul", and "shaping form", linked to the Chinese Academy of Social Sciences' project on the origins and early development of Chinese civilisation and to the national "Archaeology of China" programme.

The term also figures in the highest-level political register. In April 2020, on an inspection tour of Shaanxi, Xi Jinping said that "Shaanxi is one of the important birthplaces of the Chinese nation and of Huaxia civilisation" and noted that the two characters of Zhongguo first appear on the He zun, the bronze vessel found at Baoji. In ordinary political and media language, Huaxia functions as the elevated, descent-neutral name for people of Chinese origin worldwide, as in the standard phrase "sons and daughters of Huaxia" (華夏兒女).

The state terminology project Key Concepts in Chinese Thought and Culture gives the following English definition: "The forefathers of the Han people living in the Central Plains referred to themselves by this term. Earlier on they called themselves Hua, Zhuhua, Xia or Zhuxia. The term Huaxia embodies the common identity of the way of life, language, and culture of the people living in the Central Plains, mainly the Han people, and the inheritance of such identity." The entry glosses Xia as "big and great" and quotes Kong Yingda, and its framing equates Huaxia with the Han people, a rendering that some scholarship would qualify given the term's transferability discussed above.

Within the pair, Zhongguo is tied by association to a state, whereas Zhonghua chiefly concerns culture. The word Huaren (華人, "Chinese person") is an abbreviation of Huaxia with the addition of ren (人, "person"), in which Hua stands for Huaxia. Huaren denotes people of Chinese ethnicity generally, whereas Zhongguoren (中國人) usually though not always denotes citizens of China; the distinction is politically salient in Taiwan, and Huaren or Huaqiao (華僑, overseas Chinese) are the usual terms in overseas communities such as those of Singapore and Malaysia, whose members are not citizens of China.

The element also appears in taxonomic naming, as in the theropod Huaxiagnathus and the pterosaur Huaxiadraco.

Huaxia is also a prestige element in commercial naming, appearing in the names of a national joint-stock bank, an asset management company, and other cultural and educational institutions in China and among overseas Chinese communities.

== Historiography and open questions ==
Chinese-language sources on the term are numerous but vary considerably in quality. Consultation of the peer-reviewed literature, the Chinese Academy of Social Sciences' scholarly serials, and the palaeographic databases is generally required to establish the dating and the semantics of the term.

Several questions remain open within the field:

- Which sense of Xia came first, "great", "refined", or "the dynastic house". The administrative use of Xia in third-century BCE Qin law suggests that the term was already a category of belonging before the imperial period, which pushes the semantic question back into the unwritten centuries before the Spring and Autumn period.
- Why Hua specifically. The flower-to-splendour semantic bridge is clear, but why this word, rather than mei (美), zhang (章), or wen (文), became the ethnic partner of Xia has not been explained.
- The relationship between Huaxia and Zhongguo. The evidence supports two overlapping but distinct terms, cultural and spatial respectively, followed by a later merger, but no consensus formulation has been reached.
- The translation question. Whether Huaxia, Yi, and Di should be translated at all remains contested, with Di Cosmo's position that "barbarian" cannot be rendered into Chinese at one pole and the official terminology project's "Huaxia / the Han People" at the other.

== See also ==
- Names of China
- Han Chinese
- Hua-Yi distinction
- Four Barbarians
- Kokutai, a comparable concept of national essence in Japan
- Little China (ideology)
- Neolithic China
- Peopling of China
- Sinocentrism
- Tianxia
- Xia dynasty
- Yanhuang and Yan Huang Zisun, the "descendants of Yan and Huang"
- Zhonghua
