= Lü Liuliang =

Han Chinese poet and author

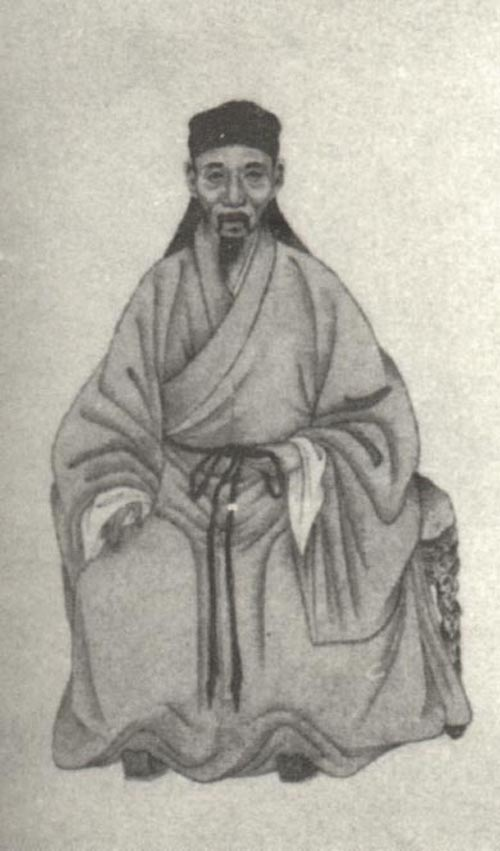
Portrait of Lü Liuliang

Lü Liuliang (Chinese: 呂留良; 1629–3 October 1683) was a Han Chinese poet and author from Tongxiang, Zhejiang province. He was born under the Ming dynasty but died under the Manchu Qing dynasty.

== Career ==
In 1647 one of his nephews was executed for anti-Qing activity. Lü took active part in the anti-Manchu military movement that followed the fall of the Ming in 1644. After the failure of the Ming loyalist movement, he became a hermit and a physician. He refused to serve the new dynasty, despite frequent requests, because he argued that upholding the difference between Hua and barbarians was more important than respecting the righteous bond between minister and sovereign.

Lü Liuliang wrote a famous anti-Qing poem. "The light breeze, however delicate, does not blow on me; the bright moon has never stopped casting its light on us." (清風雖細難吹我，明月何嘗不照人?) In this poem, the "light breeze" (qing feng 清風) contains the character for "Qing" (as in the dynasty), and "bright moon" (ming yue 明月) the character for "Ming". He also wrote many eight-legged essays.

Lü is also one of the most prominent cases in Chinese history of literary inquisition. After Lü's death, an official named Zeng Jing was inspired by his anti-Qing writing to attempt to overthrow the Yongzheng Emperor. As a result, in 1733, Lü's corpse and that of one of his sons were exhumed and mutilated, another son was executed, his grandsons were exiled and female relatives enslaved, and all of his writings were banned. Two of his followers were treated similarly.

He is a character in Jin Yong's wuxia novel The Deer and the Cauldron.
