= Ganden Phodrang =

Form of Tibetan government

Ganden Phodrang དགའ་ལྡན་ཕོ་བྲང 甘丹頗章
- 1642–1959
- Status: Protectorate of the Khoshut Khanate (1642–1717); Protectorate of the Dzungar Khanate (1717–1720); Protectorate of the Qing dynasty (1720–1912); Protectorate of the People's Republic of China (1951–1959)
- Capital: Lhasa
- Common languages: Tibetan
- Religion: Tibetan Buddhism
- Government: Lugs gnyis
- Dalai Lama
  - 1642–1682: 5th Dalai Lama (first)
  - 1950–1959: 14th Dalai Lama (last)
- History
  - Established: 1642
  - Disestablished: 1959
- Currency: Tibetan currency

The Ganden Phodrang or Ganden Podrang (Tibetan: དགའ་ལྡན་ཕོ་བྲང, Wylie: dGa' ldan pho brang, Lhasa dialect: [ˈkɑ̃̀tɛ̃̀ ˈpʰóʈɑ̀ŋ]; Chinese: 甘丹頗章; pinyin: Gāndān Pōzhāng) was the Tibetan system of government established by the 5th Dalai Lama in 1642, when the Oirat lord Güshi Khan who founded the Khoshut Khanate conferred all spiritual and political power in Tibet to him in a ceremony in Shigatse. During the ceremony, the Dalai Lama "made a proclamation declaring that Lhasa would be the capital of Tibet and the government of would be known as Gaden Phodrang" which eventually became the seat of the Gelug school's leadership authority. The Dalai Lama chose the name of his monastic residence at Drepung Monastery for the new Tibetan government's name: Ganden (དགའ་ལྡན), the Tibetan name for Tushita heaven, which, according to Buddhist cosmology, is where the future Buddha Maitreya resides; and Phodrang (ཕོ་བྲང), a palace, hall, or dwelling. Lhasa's Red Fort again became the capitol building of Tibet, and the Ganden Phodrang operated there and adjacent to the Potala Palace until 1959.

During the 17th century, the Dalai Lama established the priest and patron relationship with China's Qing emperors, a few decades before the Chinese expedition to Tibet (1720). Meanwhile, the Qing became increasingly active in governing Tibet with the establishment of imperial resident (Amban) and Chinese garrison stationed in Lhasa since the early 18th century and took advantage of crisis situations in Tibet to intervene in Tibetan affairs each time, although this also caused some dissatisfaction and uprisings within Tibet, such as the Batang uprising in 1905. A governing council known as the Kashag also operated in the Ganden Phodrang administration. During the British expedition to Tibet (1904) and the Chinese expedition to Tibet (1910) before the 1911 Revolution which led to the fall of the Qing dynasty in 1912, the Ganden Phodrang continued to govern Tibet under the Qing protectorate. After the Chinese Civil War which led to the establishment of the People's Republic of China and the subsequent signing of the Sino-Tibetan Seventeen Point Agreement in 1951, the annexation of Tibet by the People's Republic of China began, although the Dalai Lama escaped from Tibet and declared the revocation of the agreement following the 1959 Tibetan uprising.

== Name ==
"Ganden Phodrang" originally referred to the residential quarters of the Dalai Lama lineage at Drepung Monastery since the 2nd Dalai Lama. When the 5th Dalai Lama came to power and the expansion of the Potala Palace began, the Dalai Lama moved away from the actual quarters Ganden Phodrang and stayed at the Potala in the winter and Norbulingka in the summer. According to some, the Ganden Phodrang is represented by the Central Tibetan Administration or Dalai Lama's government-in-exile in Dharamshala, India after 1959. However, this is "Ganden Phodrang" in a different sense, the personal service or labrang of the Dalai Lama.

== History ==
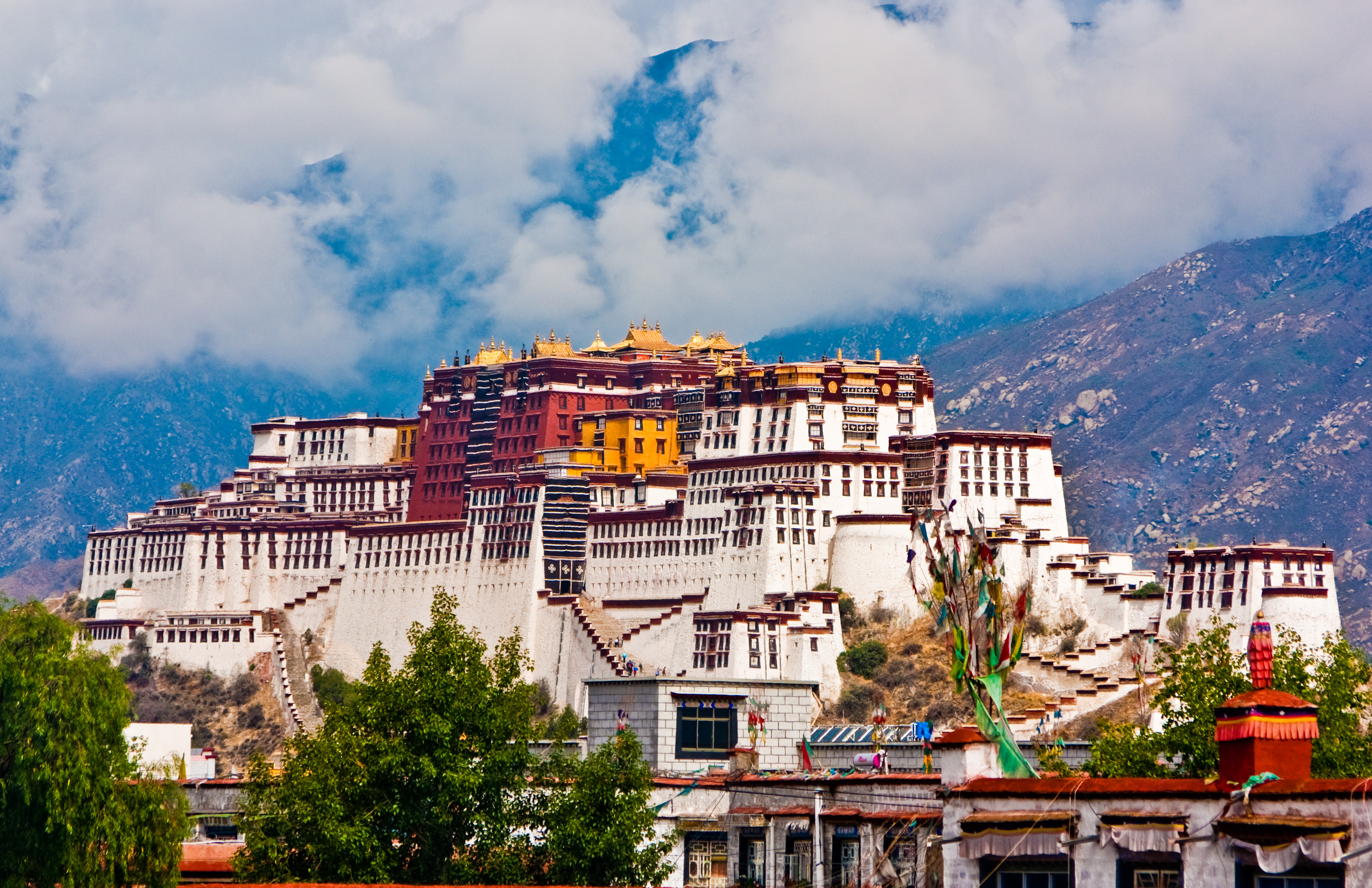
The Potala Palace in Lhasa.

=== Background ===
Altan Khan of the Tümed Mongols chose the Gelug order of Tibetan Buddhism as his Buddhist faith. In 1577 he invited the leader of this order, Sonam Gyatso, to come to Mongolia and teach his people. He designated Sonam Gyatso as "Dalai" (a translation into Mongolian of the name Gyatso, meaning "ocean"). As a result, Sonam Gyatso became known as the Dalai Lama. Since this title was also posthumously given to Gendun Drup and Gendun Gyatso, who were considered Sonam Gyatso's previous incarnations, Sonam Gyatso was recognized as being already the 3rd Dalai Lama.

=== Mongol protectorate ===
The 5th Dalai Lama (r. 1642–1682) is known for unifying the Tibetan heartland under the control of the Gelug school of Tibetan Buddhism, after defeating the rival Kagyu and Jonang sects and the secular ruler, the Tsangpa prince, in a prolonged civil war. His efforts were successful in part because of aid from Güshi Khan, the Oirat leader who established the Khoshut Khanate. With Güshi Khan as a completely uninvolved patron, who had conferred supreme authority on the Dalai Lama for the whole of Tibet at a ceremony at Tashilhunpo Monastery in Shigatse, the 5th Dalai Lama and his intimates established a civil administration which is referred to by historians as the Lhasa state. All power and authority lay in the hands of the Dalai Lama right up to his death and Güshi Khan did not interfere in the administration nor tried to control its policies. The core leadership of this government is also referred to as the "Ganden Phodrang" or "Ganden Podrang", derived from the name of the estate of the Dalai Lamas at Drepung Monastery.

The 5th Dalai Lama initiated the construction of the Potala Palace in Lhasa on the site of the Red Fort, and moved the centre of government there from Drepung. It remained the chief residence of the Dalai Lama until the 14th Dalai Lama fled to India during the 1959 Tibetan uprising.

From 1679 to 1684, the Ganden Phodrang fought in the Tibet–Ladakh–Mughal War against the Namgyal dynasty of neighboring Ladakh, with the 5th Dalai Lama overruling the advice of his Prime Minister. The 5th Dalai Lama died in 1682 and the subsequent Prime Minister, Desi Sangye Gyatso, agreed on the 1684 Treaty of Tingmosgang with the King Delek Namgyal of Ladakh to end the war. The original text of the Treaty of Tingmosgang no longer survives, but its contents are summarized in the Ladakh Chronicles.

The Dzungar–Qing Wars (1687–1757) between the Dzungar Khanate and Qing China had a major impact for Tibet. While the military landscape of Inner Asia in the late 17th century was dominated by the conflict between the Dzungars and the Qing, the Ganden Phodrang regime was also involved in the war because of its religious role, which was sometimes disingenuous. In 1705, the Qing conspired with a Dzungar faction to kidnap the 6th Dalai Lama, after the murder of his regent and government official. Due to these actions, Tibet's relationship with the Mongols declined in popularity.

=== Qing protectorate ===
In 1717, the last khan of the Khoshut Khanate, Lha-bzang Khan, was killed by the Mongol Dzungar Khanate forces invading Lhasa. The Dzungar forces were in turn expelled by the expedition forces of the Qing dynasty from Tibet in 1720, thus beginning the period of Qing rule of Tibet. Tibet was a protectorate of the Qing while remaining a priest and patron relationship. The Qing dynasty exerted military and administrative control over Tibet while granting it a degree of political autonomy.

The Kashag, the governing council of Tibet that lasted in Lhasa until the 1950s, was created in 1721 by the Qing. The council was to govern Tibet under the close supervision of the Chinese garrison commander stationed in Lhasa, who quite often interfered with the decisions of the Kashag, especially when Chinese interests were involved.

Soon after 1727 the skilful and politically astute Tibetan leader Pholhane reorganized the administration and army with Qing's support. After the death of Pholhane in 1747, his son Gyurme Namgyal moved to end the cooperation with Qing China by trying to expel the last of their troops from Lhasa, whose numbers varied over the decades. He was murdered by two Qing China ambassadors (ambans) in 1750, both of whom were killed by Gyurme Namgyal's army during the subsequent riot in Lhasa. After the riot, Qianlong Emperor of the Qing dynasty sent an army to Tibet and reorganized the Tibetan government in 1751, including the Kashag which was further set by the Qing.

In 1788, problematic relations with Nepal led to wars with Nepal. Tibetans requested Qing intervention, which resulted in the Sino-Nepalese War. After the war, Nepal also agreed to accept the suzerainty of the Chinese emperor. Qing also issued the "Twenty-Nine Article Imperial Ordinance of 1793", which was designed to enhance the ambans' status, and ordered them to control border inspections, and serve as conduits through which the Dalai Lama and his cabinet were to communicate with the Qing emperors. The Golden Urn system was also instituted in this degree, although the system was not always used (in such cases the amban was consulted).

By the mid-19th century, Chinese hegemony over Tibet became weaker. In 1841-1842, the Tibetan army defeated the Sikh Empire's Dogra forces in the Dogra–Tibetan War, leading to a treaty agreeing on status quo ante. In the third Nepalese war (1855–1856) Tibet was defeated by the Nepal, but the resulting Treaty of Thapathali included provisions for mutual aid against aggressors.

The first Europeans to arrive in Tibet were the Portuguese missionaries António de Andrade and Manuel Marques in 1624. They were welcomed by the King and Queen of Guge, and were allowed to build a church and to introduce the Christian faith. The king of Guge eagerly accepted Christianity as an offsetting religious influence to dilute the thriving Gelugpa and to counterbalance his potential rivals and consolidate his position. All missionaries were expelled in 1745.

=== Post-Qing era ===
After the fall of the Qing dynasty in 1911, which ended Qing rule over Tibet, the 13th Dalai Lama declared himself ruler of an independent Tibet. It was considered by the Republic of China as a part of the new republic, which gave Tibet the status of an "Area". With its proclamation of independence and conduct of its own internal and external affairs in this era, Tibet is regarded as a "de facto independent state" during this period.

This would last until 1951, when Tibet was annexed by the People's Republic of China. The Kashag state structure remained in place for a few years but was formally dissolved in 1959 after the 1959 Tibetan uprising. The Tibet Autonomous Region was established by China in 1965 out of a part of the Tibetan ethno-cultural area. The Central Tibetan Administration was established by the 14th Dalai Lama and based in McLeod Ganj India since 1959.

== See also ==
- Kashag
- Dalai Lama
- Mongol conquest of Tibet
- Khoshut Khanate
- Dzungar Khanate
- Tibet under Qing rule
- Tibet (1912–1951)
- List of rulers of Tibet
- Tibetan Government-in-Exile
- Sikyong
- Lobsang Sangay
