= Xinhai Lhasa turmoil =

1911–1912 conflicts in Tibet

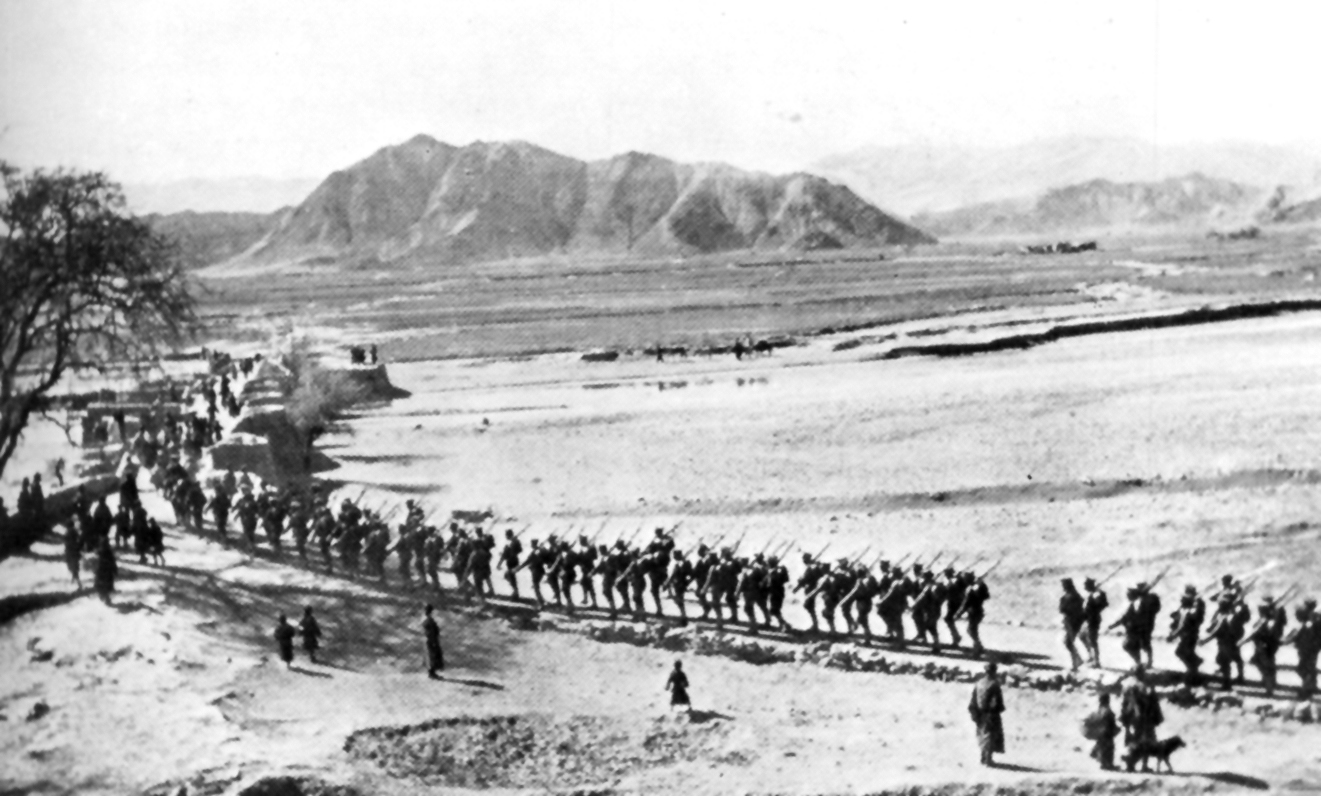
- After the fall of the Qing dynasty, Sichuan New Army left Lhasa in 1912.
Date	1911 (mutinies)–1912 (expulsion)
Location	Tibet
Result	Tibetan victory; Tibet becomes a de facto independent country.

Belligerents
(Tibet) Tibetan militia; Supported by: Britain	Government of the Tibet Region (Qing); Supported by: Republic of China

Commanders and leaders
13th Dalai Lama; Tsarong Dazang Dramdul; 3rd Tsomonling Rinpoche; Xie Guoliang	Zhong Ying; Lianyu

Casualties and losses
Unknown	Unknown

The Xinhai Lhasa turmoil (Tibetan: ཆུ་བྱི་དམག་འཁྲུག་, Wylie: chu byi dmag 'khrug; Chinese: 辛亥拉薩動亂), also known as the 1912 expulsion of the Han force (Chinese: 驅漢事件), was a series of mutinies among military troops of the Qing Empire stationed in Lhasa, Tibet, followed by the military conflicts between Tibetan militia and Qing garrison. It effectively resulted in the end of Qing rule in Tibet.

The influence of the Wuchang Uprising on October, 1911 rapidly spread to the frontier region. As a result, the 13th Dalai Lama was able to eliminate Qing forces in Tibet. After months of fighting between Chinese and Tibetan armies, the Chinese withdrew from Tibet, and the Dalai Lama returned as the sole administrator.

== Background ==
Resulted from Qing worries about its national interests after 1903 British expedition, the Qing Government sent a military force of 2,000 troops to Tibet, then its protectorate, to increase its authority there in 1910. This caused the 13th Dalai Lama to flee to British India and a rupture in Sino-Tibetan relations. During his absence, China implemented a variety of measures to increase its control over Tibet. Zhang Yintang, an official sent to negotiate with the British government in India, was appointed as the Imperial High Commissioner in Tibet. He introduced a variety of "new deal" reforms in the administration, vastly curtailed the British influence in Tibet, and managed to win over sections of Tibetan population. The Qing amban in Tibet, Lianyu, had his own reforms to implement, which were said to be considerably less popular. The tensions between them caused Zhang to leave in June 1907.

== Qing army mutiny ==
In late 1911, as the Qing dynasty fell apart elsewhere in China, tensions in Lhasa reached a breaking point. Rumors about Han-Tibetan ethnic conflict ran high, and unpaid salaries and power struggles among officers sparked a full-scale mutiny in September 1911. Rebel Qing troops seized weapons and attacked loyalist officers, briefly detaining Lianyu. After the establishment of the Republic of China in January 1912, the Qing troops who mutinied in Lhasa established a public council with the intention of seizing power from the former Qing government's Tibet office. Subsequently, a series of lawless and undisciplined acts occurred among its personnel, including the occupation of Sera Monastery to plunder more property, which aroused the indignation of the Tibetan people.

== Tibetan liberation struggle ==
When news of mutinous troops looting and disturbing the people reached the exiled Dalai Lama, he seized the opportunity to galvanize the Tibetan people. In early April 1912, from his sanctuary in India he issued the Proclamation to the People, urging all Tibetans to rise up against the Qing officers and soldiers' presence. In this proclamation, he framed the proposed uprising as a struggle for Tibetan liberation, noting that the Qing troops had terrorized civilians with plunder and violence, and called on Tibetans to disobey all orders issued by the newly established Chinese republican government.

This proclamation had immediate effect: thousands of Tibetans from across the region took up arms. Under leaders appointed by the Dalai Lama (notably the commander Tsarong), Tibetan militias rapidly formed. By mid-April these militia forces, numbering in the tens of thousands, were marching against the Qing garrisons. In April 1912, Qing detachments at Gyantse and Shigatse were encircled by militia forces; the British trade agent David MacDonald negotiated their surrender or escape, and many Qing soldiers fled south into India. Meanwhile, the main Qing column under Colonel Zhong Ying found itself besieged in Lhasa. Under Tsarong's direction, Tibetan forces tightened the blockade.

== Peace negotiations ==
=== First negotiation ===
By the summer of 1912 both sides had endured months of siege and skirmish. On July 3, Zhong Ying received a telegram from the Government of China under President Yuan Shikai, stating that "Commander Zhong can persuade the Dalai Lama to submit... You should try your best to appease them and not kill them indiscriminately, lest we perish together." Zhong and others then telegraphed the Dalai Lama on July 26, "strongly advocating peace to preserve the overall situation." Exhausted and short of supplies, the Tibetans and remaining Qing troops agreed to a ceasefire. In early August 1912 a British representative mediated an armistice. The agreement required the Qing forces to surrender their weapons and promised that Chinese soldiers would leave Lhasa in stages. After the successful negotiation, on September 3, Zhong learned that he had been appointed as the Chief of the Tibet Office, a position equivalent to that of the former Qing amban in Tibet, by the Government of China on May 9. He then remained in Lhasa as his new position.

=== Conflict resurgence ===
The first truce quickly fell apart. Tibetan leaders insisted that all Chinese officers, including Zhong, and military men depart the region, a demand which the Chinese could not accept. On September 16, the Government of China sent a telegram to Zhong and others, ordering them to "reaffirm their adherence to the agreement and safeguard Chinese territorial sovereignty. They must not hastily leave Tibet, lest they incur the blame of abandoning territory."

Hostilities flared up again on 24 September 1912. By then, most of the Qing troops had already marched away due to the previous peace negotiation, leaving only about 200 soldiers to defend Lhasa. Surrounded and outnumbered, for nearly two months the garrison made a desperate stand against the Tibetan militia. By early November the remaining defenders were compelled to sue for peace once more.

=== Final negotiation ===
On 14 November 1912 a second armistice was concluded. The agreement allowed Chinese civilians (merchants and their families) to remain if they wished, but it unequivocally required the military and governing personnel to withdraw. Zhong accepted these conditions and led his remaining troops out of Lhasa on 12 December 1912. In the months that followed he briefly lingered near the Yunnan border, but under Dalai Lama pressure he departed Tibet in April 1913. Zhong's exit marked the end of any Chinese military and political presence in Lhasa and effectively in Tibet as a whole.

== Aftermath ==
With the Tibetan victory, Tibet entered a new era of de facto independence. Following the establishment of the Republic of China, President Yuan Shikai sent a telegram to the Dalai Lama, restoring his earlier titles. The Dalai Lama spurned these titles, replying that he "intended to exercise both temporal and ecclesiastical rule in Tibet." In 1913 he returned to Lhasa and issued the Regulations for the monks and laypeople in Tibet, in which he stated that Tibet is a "small, religious, and independent nation", and that the relationship between Beijing and Tibet "had been that of patron and priest and had not been based on the subordination of one to the other". It was not until 1934 that the Government of China resumed sending resident officials to Tibet.

In January 1913, Agvan Dorzhiev and three other Tibetan representatives signed a treaty between Tibet and Mongolia in Urga, proclaiming mutual recognition and their independence from China. However, The British diplomat Charles Bell wrote that the 13th Dalai Lama told him that he had not authorized Agvan Dorzhiev to conclude any treaties on behalf of Tibet.

The Dalai Lama also began implementing new policies, including the first issuance of paper money, the issuance of Snow Lion stamps, and the establishment of a modern postal system. The Tibetan government also began to solidify Tibet's borders. In 1913–14 Tibetan envoys joined talks in Simla under British auspices to delimit the frontier with India, and in 1917 Tibet launched campaigns into Kham, known as the First Sino–Tibetan War, to seize territories from the Sichuan clique.

== See also ==
- Tibet under Qing rule
- Lhasa riot of 1750
- Chinese expedition to Tibet (1910)
- 1911 Revolution
- Tibet (1912–1951)
- Tibetan independence movement
- Dalai Lama
