= Mongol invasions of Tibet =

Invasions of 1206–1723

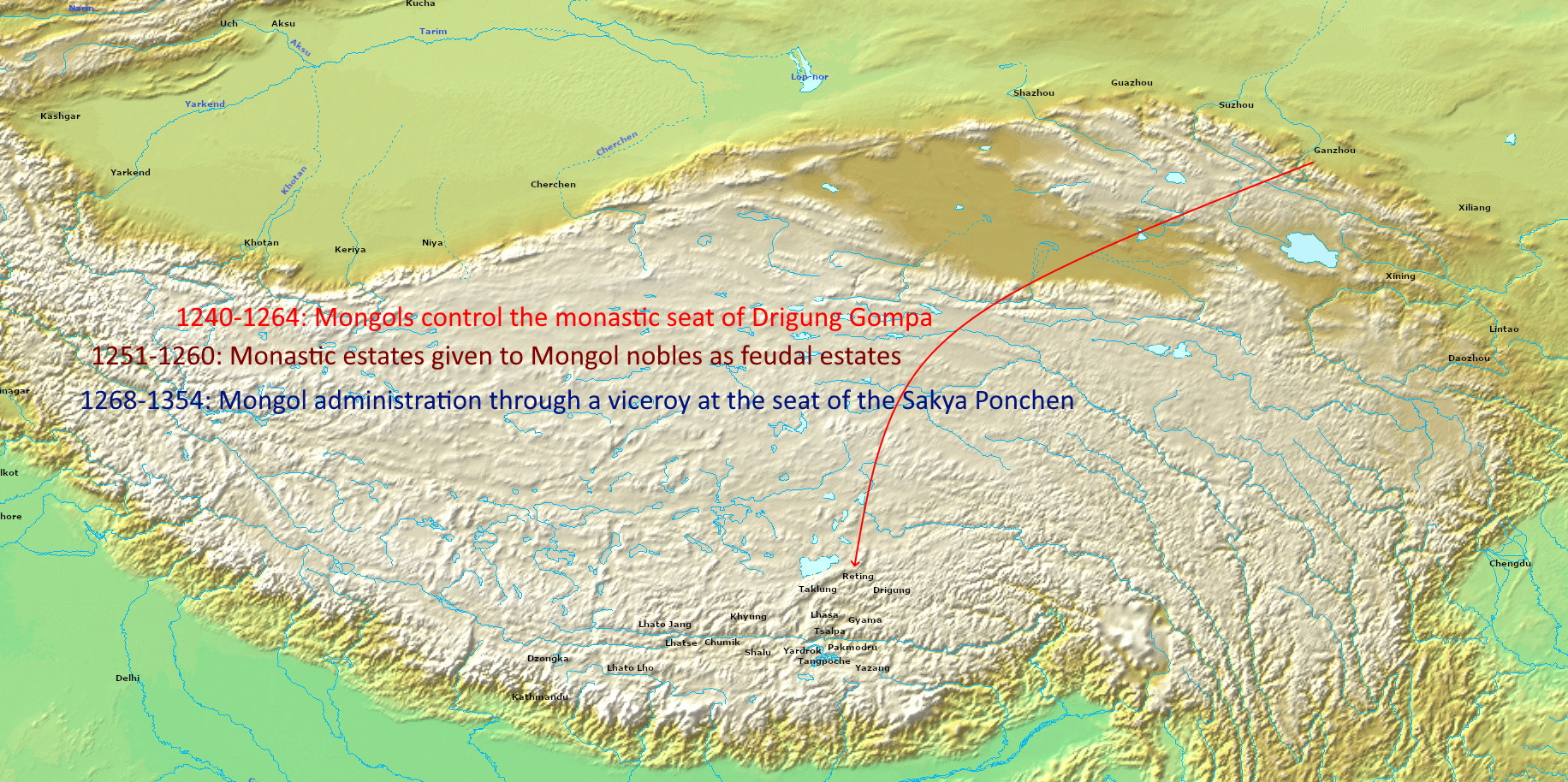
Tibet under Mongol rule, 1240–1354

The Mongols invaded Tibet several times. The earliest is the alleged plot to invade Tibet by Genghis Khan in 1206, which is considered anachronistic; there is no evidence of Mongol-Tibetan encounters prior to the military campaign in 1240. The first confirmed campaign is the invasion of Tibet by the Mongol general Doorda Darkhan in 1240, a campaign of 30,000 troops that resulted in 500 casualties. The campaign was smaller than the full-scale invasions used by the Mongols against large empires. The purpose of this attack is unclear, and is still in debate among Tibetologists. Then in the late 1240s Mongol prince Godan invited Sakya lama Sakya Pandita, who urged other leading Tibetan figures to submit to Mongol authority. This is generally considered to have marked the beginning of Mongol rule over Tibet, as well as the establishment of patron and priest relationship between Mongols and Tibetans. These relations were continued by Kublai Khan, who founded the Mongol Yuan dynasty and granted authority over whole Tibet to Drogon Chogyal Phagpa, nephew of Sakya Pandita. The Sakya-Mongol administrative system and Yuan administrative rule over the region lasted until the mid-14th century, when the Yuan dynasty began to crumble.

In the early 17th century, the Oirat Mongols again conquered the region and established the Khoshut Khanate. Since then the Mongols had intervened in Tibetan politics until the Qing conquest of Mongolia and Dzungaria.

== Mongol Empire invasions ==
=== Problems with sources ===
The Mongol conquest of Tibet is often poorly understood due to the quality of sources involved: the Tibetan sources have a poor understanding of Mongol society and history, the Persian sources confuse Tibet and Western Xia, and the Chinese terms used for Tibet are often mistranslated. One Tibetan source, Rdor nag chos skor byung tshul, confuses the Mongol royal family tree completely and states that Godan was the father of Hulegu and Kublai and that Hulegu was the elder brother. In reality Godan was the son of Ögedei and Kublai was older than Hulegu. The source also tells of a fictitious enmity between Kublai and Hulegu that resulted in Hulegu's rebellion against Kublai when in reality it was Ariq Böke who rebelled against Kublai. Other events contained in the Tibetan source include an invasion by the Ilkhanate to wrest control of Tibet from the Yuan dynasty and Kublai ordering Hulegu to invade Persia. The source almost certainly mixed up Kaidu with the Ilkhanate and Möngke's role with Kublai. In the New Red Annals, written in 1538, Ögedei is confused with Godan, who the source states as having reigned for six years after the death of Genghis, and referred to as king (rgyal-po). According to Stephen G. Haw, Tibetan sources on the Mongol invasions can only be used with extreme caution and that the Chinese sources are generally more reliable due to their more contemporaneous nature. However the Chinese sources are mainly concerned with events that were relevant to the Chinese heartlands and paid little attention to Tibet. The official History of Yuan compiled during the Ming dynasty only contains fragments of information about the Mongol invasions of Tibet and is very weak on the early years of Mongol reign.

As a result of the poverty of sources, there are now mainly two versions of events pertaining to the Mongol invasions of Tibet. The "traditional" account, based on Mongol and Tibetan sources written centuries after the events, tell of a submission by Tibetan chiefs to Genghis Khan. The traditional account states that in 1207, Tibetan leaders held a meeting and decided to submit to Genghis Khan, but ceased paying tribute after the khan's death, resulting in retribution in 1240 in the form of an invasion by Prince Godan. Further military campaigns by the Mongols in 1252 and later brought Tibet under the dominion of the Mongols with the Sakya hierarchs as their regents. This version of events was replaced in 1977 by T.V. Wylie's account which starts with an invasion of Tibet by the Mongols beginning in 1240. Scholarship since the 2000s has arrived at a picture of gradual conquest stretching from the 1240s to the 1250s.

=== Prior to 1240 ===
According to one traditional Tibetan account, Genghis Khan planned on invading Tibet in 1206 but was dissuaded when the Tibetans promised to pay tribute to the Mongols. Modern scholars consider the account to be anachronistic. According to Wylie, Genghis was probably targeting the Tangut kingdom of Western Xia, not Tibet, and there was certainly no tribute being paid to the Mongols prior to 1240. Wylie believes there is no evidence of interaction between Tibet and the Mongols prior to Doorda Darkhan's invasion in 1240.

According to Haw, Genghis may have targeted Tibet because Ilkha Sengün, the son of Toghrul, had fled to Tibet. Ilkha Sengün was responsible for stirring up enmity between Toghrul and Genghis. According to both Persian and Chinese sources, Ilkha Sengün fled to either Tibet or the Western Xia.

It is uncertain when the Mongols made contact with the Tibetans. According to the History of Yuan, Subutai requested permission to attack the Kipchaks and was allowed to do so. He returned after successfully defeating them and plundered the Tibetan border tribes. During the Mongol campaign against Western Xia in 1225-1227, Subutai conquered the Sarigh Uyghurs who lived in Tibet to the west of Koko Nor. In 1225 there was a rebellion by a Tibetan general named Nyirong and a Uyghur general that was put down by a Yuan general named Guo Dehai (son of Guo Baoyu who defected from the Jin to the Mongols). Later in 1236 when the Mongols were attacking Sichuan, an army led by Anjul received the submission of ten Tibetan chieftains and rewarded them with silver insignia.

=== 1240–1241 invasion ===
Doorda Darkhan's Tibetan campaign
Date	1240
Location	Tibet
Result	Mongols withdrew. All Mongol generals were called back to Mongolia to appoint a successor to Ogedai Khan.

Belligerents
Mongol Empire	Tibet

Commanders and leaders
Doorda Darkhan	Leaders of the Reting Monastery

Strength
30,000 soldiers	Unknown

Casualties and losses
Minimal (or no loss)	500

The first real Mongol invasion of Tibet may have happened in 1240 under the leadership of Dor-ta (Doorda Darqan). The primary Tibetan source for this invasion gives no precise date for its occurrence. The date of 1240 is based on a source completed in 1565. The History does state that Godan, Ögedei's son and Güyük's younger brother, took action against Tibet around this time. According to the History, Li Hulanji followed Godan to attack the southern river valleys of Tibet in 1241. Godan "delegated the command of the Tibetan invasion to the Tangut general, Doorda Darqan (Dor-ta)".

The attack consisted of 30,000 men (possibly much smaller than that) and resulted in 500 casualties, along with the burning of the Kadampa monasteries of Reting and Rgyal-lha-khang. Dor-ta is said to have penetrated Tibet all the way to Nepal and Bhutan, and established Mongol laws and brought peace to the region. In accordance with the small size of the invasion, there is not a single record of a battle between the Mongols and Tibetans during the invasion. The only recorded casualties were 500 monks. According to Haw, this was probably due to the political fragmentation of Tibet at the time as no single organization in Tibet could offer up a coordinated response to the Mongols. The campaign was smaller than the full-scale invasions used by the Mongols against large empires. According to Wylie, that much is in agreement among Tibetologists. However, the purpose of invasion is disputed among Tibetan scholars, partly because of the abundance of anachronistic and factually erroneous sources.

Modern studies find that the oldest sources credit the Mongol scouts with burning Rgyal-lha-khang only, while a large number of Reting monks were slain. The bKa’-brgyud-pa monasteries of Taglung Monastery and Drigung Monastery, with their old link to the Western Xia, were spared because Dor-ta himself was a Tangut Buddhist. The Drigung abbot or, according to Petech, the Reting abbot, suggested the Mongols had invited the Sakya hierarch, Sakya Pandita. After he met Godan, Sakya Pandita died there leaving his two nephews. Sakya Pandita convinced other monasteries in Central Tibet to align with the Mongols. The Mongols kept them as hostages meant to represent the symbolic surrender of Tibet.

The traditional view and reason given for the invasion was that Tibet refused to pay tribute. However Wylie points out that over ten years had passed between the cessation of tribute and the invasion, making it unlikely as a reason. Wylie suggests that rather than seeking a fugitive that had fled to Tibet, the campaign was a reconnaissance mission meant to evaluate the situation in Tibet. The Mongols hoped to find a single ruler to force into submission but found Tibet politically fragmented and without a central government. Another view is that the invasion was simply meant to pillage the wealth of the Tibetan monasteries, however Wylie considers this unlikely since the Mongols deliberately avoided attacking certain monasteries.

Whatever the purpose of the invasion, the Mongols withdrew in 1241, as all the Mongol princes were recalled back to Mongolia in preparation for the appointment of a successor to Ögedei Khan.

=== 1244 invasion ===
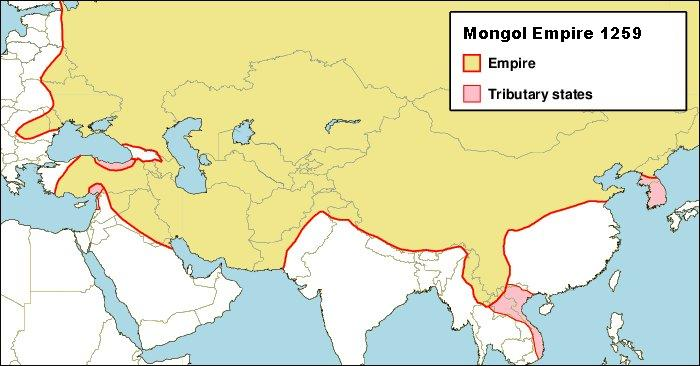
The Mongol Empire in 1259

According to Haw, a directive by Möngke Khan for different generals in different places, including Tibet, to continue attacking implied that the Mongols were engaged in an unfinished war in Tibet in 1251. It is uncertain what occurred in Tibet between 1241 and 1251 if anything at all. There is an account of an incursion into Bengal from Tibet in 1244 which may have just been a reconnaissance or raiding party. Some sources say there was an invasion in 1251, in retribution for a failure to pay tribute, or in 1251-2 'to take formal possession of the country'. Möngke made Qoridai commander of the Mongol and Han troops in Turpan in 1251.

=== 1252-1254 invasion ===
Multiple armies are recorded to have entered Tibet between 1252 and 1255. Two Mongol armies, one led by Dörbetei, and one led by Dörbetei subjugated Tibet. An invasion by Uriyangkhadai is also mentioned to have occurred in early 1254. Most of Tibet likely came under the control of the Mongols after these invasions. Later sources dating from 1461 to 1600 state that units were established in Tibet under Möngke's reign: the General Regional Military Command for Tibet seated in Hezhou and the Pacification Office for Tibet and Other Places seated at Tianquan (now in western Sichuan.

Although, Karmapa of the Karma Kagyu school politely refused to stay with him, preferring his brother the Khagan, in 1253 Prince Kubilai summoned to his court the Sakyapa hierarch's two nephews, Blo-gros rGyal-mtshan, known as Phagpa lama (1235–80), and Phyag-na rDo-rje (1239–67) from the late Godan's ordo in Liangzhou. Khubilai Khan first met Phagpa lama in 1253, presumably to bring the Sakya lama who resided in Godan's domain, and who was a symbol of Tibetan surrender, to his own camp. Tibetan and Chinese sources concur that Phagpa was placed in charge of the Thirteen Myriarchies of Tibet in 1253. Kublai's chief khatun, Chabi, converted to Buddhism and influenced Kulbia's shamanist religious view.

=== Aftermath ===
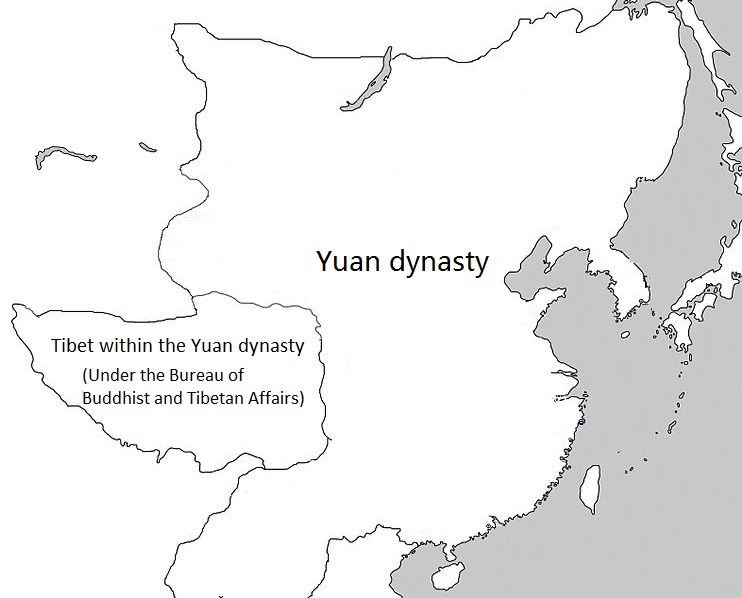
Tibet within the Yuan dynasty under the top-level department known as the Bureau of Buddhist and Tibetan Affairs (Xuanzheng Yuan).

The Mongols started setting up more elaborate administrative structures in Tibet in the 1260s. In 1264, the Mongols organized 18 Tibetan clans into Anxi Prefecture. In 1268, the prefecture was subordinated to Tuosima Route. In 1269, the Pacification Office and General Military Command for Tibet and Other Places subordinated to the Branch Secretariat for Shaanxi and later the Bureau of Buddhist and Tibetan Affairs. There were other governmental structures in Tibet but the editors of the History note that they lacked information on these administrative units. The Da Ming Yi Tong Zhi says that Kublai set up lower tiers of local government in Tibet that were under the overall authority of the Imperial Preceptor Phagpa.

According to the Tibetan traditional view, the khan and the lama established "priest-patron" relations. This meant administrative management and military assistance from the khan and assistance from the lama in spiritual issues. Tibet was conquered by the Mongols before the Mongol invasion of South China. After the conquest of the Song dynasty, Kublai Khan consolidated Tibet into the new Yuan dynasty, but Tibet was administrated under the Bureau of Buddhist and Tibetan Affairs (Xuanzheng Yuan), separate from the Chinese provinces. The Mongols granted the Sakya lama a degree political authority, but retained control over the administration and military of the region. Buddhist monks from Tibet were popular and well respected in Mongol-ruled Iran (the Ilkhanate), Mongolia, China (the Yuan) and Central Asia (the Chagatai Khanate).

As efforts to rule both territories while preserving Mongol identity, Kublai Khan prohibited Mongols from marrying Chinese, but left both the Chinese and Tibetan legal and administrative systems intact. However, most government institutions established by Kublai Khan in his court resembled the ones in earlier Chinese dynasties.

In 1268, an expedition led by Manggudai was sent to put down a rebellion in Tibet and Jiandu (modern Xichang). Another campaign was undertaken in 1275 by Prince Aurughchi in Tibet. By 1280, Mongol rule over Tibet was secure enough for expeditions to be sent to search for the source of the Yellow River.

== Khoshut intervention on Tibet ==
Khoshut intervention on Tibet
Date	1637–1641
Location	Tibet
Result	Oirat victory: Elimination of the Khalkha prescense in Amdo; Annexation of the Bonpo Kingdom; Annexation of the Tsangpa Dynasty; Unification of Tibet under the Khoshut Khanate

Belligerents
Khoshut Khanate; Dzungar Khanate	Khalkhs; Bonpo Kingdom; Tsangpa Dynasty

Commanders and leaders
(Khoshut Khanate) Güshi Khan (Dzungar Khanate) Erdeni Batur	Ligdan Khan (DOW); Choghtu Khong Tayiji †

Strength
10,000	30,000

Casualties and losses
Unknown	Heavy

The Oirats converted to Tibetan Buddhism around 1615, and it was not long before they became involved in the conflict between the Gelug and Karma Kagyu schools. At the request of the Gelug school, in 1637, Güshi Khan, the leader of the Khoshuts in Koko Nor, defeated Choghtu Khong Tayiji (1581–1637), the Khalkha prince who supported the Karma Kagyu school.

Tsogtu Khuntaiji had established a base on the Tuul river. Known as an intellectual, he embraced the Karma sect and built monasteries and castles. He submitted himself to Ligdan Khan, last grand khan of the Mongols. He took part in Ligdan's campaign to Tibet to help the Karma sect although Ligdan Khan died in 1634 before they joined. But Tsogtu pursued the campaign. In the same year he conquered the Tümed around Kokonor (Qinghai Lake) and moved his base there. By request from Shamar Rabjampa he sent an army under his son Arslan to central Tibet in 1635. However, Arslan attacked his ally, the Tsang army. He met the fifth Dalai Lama and paid homage to Gelukpa monasteries instead of destroying them. Arslan was eventually assassinated by Choghtu's order.

The Geluk sect asked for help Törü Bayikhu (Güshi Khan), the leader of the Khoshut tribe of the Oirat confederation. In 1636 Törö Bayikhu led the Khoshuts and the Dzungars to Tibet. In the next year a decisive war between Tsogtu Khuntaiji and Törü Bayikhu ended in the latter's victory and Tsoghtu was killed.

He has traditionally been portrayed as evil by the Geluk sect. On the other hand, the Mongolian movie "Tsogt taij" (1945) treated him as a national hero. It reflected the communist regime's attitude toward Tibetan Buddhism.

With his crushing victory over Tsogtu, Güshi Khan conquered Amdo (present-day Qinghai). The unification of Tibet followed in 1641–42, when Güshi Khan invaded Central Tibet and defeated the indigenous Tsangpa dynasty. After his victory he was proclaimed (chogyal), i.e. the King of Dharma, or Teaching, by the Fifth Dalai Lama. With these events the establishment of a Khoshut Khanate was confirmed. Gushi khan granted to the Dalai Lama authority over Tibet from Dartsedo to Ladakh. The title "Dalai Lama" itself had previously been bestowed upon the third lama of the Gelug tulku lineage by Altan Khan (not to be confused with the Altan Khans of the Khalkha), and means, in Mongolian, "Ocean of Wisdom."

== Resurfacing of the struggle between Dzungar Khanate and Qing dynasty ==
Mongol invasions of Tibet
Date	1688-1755
Location	Tibet
Result	Qing victory

Belligerents
Dzungar Khanate; Kokonur rebels	Qing dynasty

Commanders and leaders
Galdan Boshugtu Khan; Tsewang Rabtan; Galdan Tseren; Tsering Dhondup; Loupsang Danzan	Kangxi; Yongzheng; Qianlong; Lha-bzang Khan

=== Intervention in Tibet ===
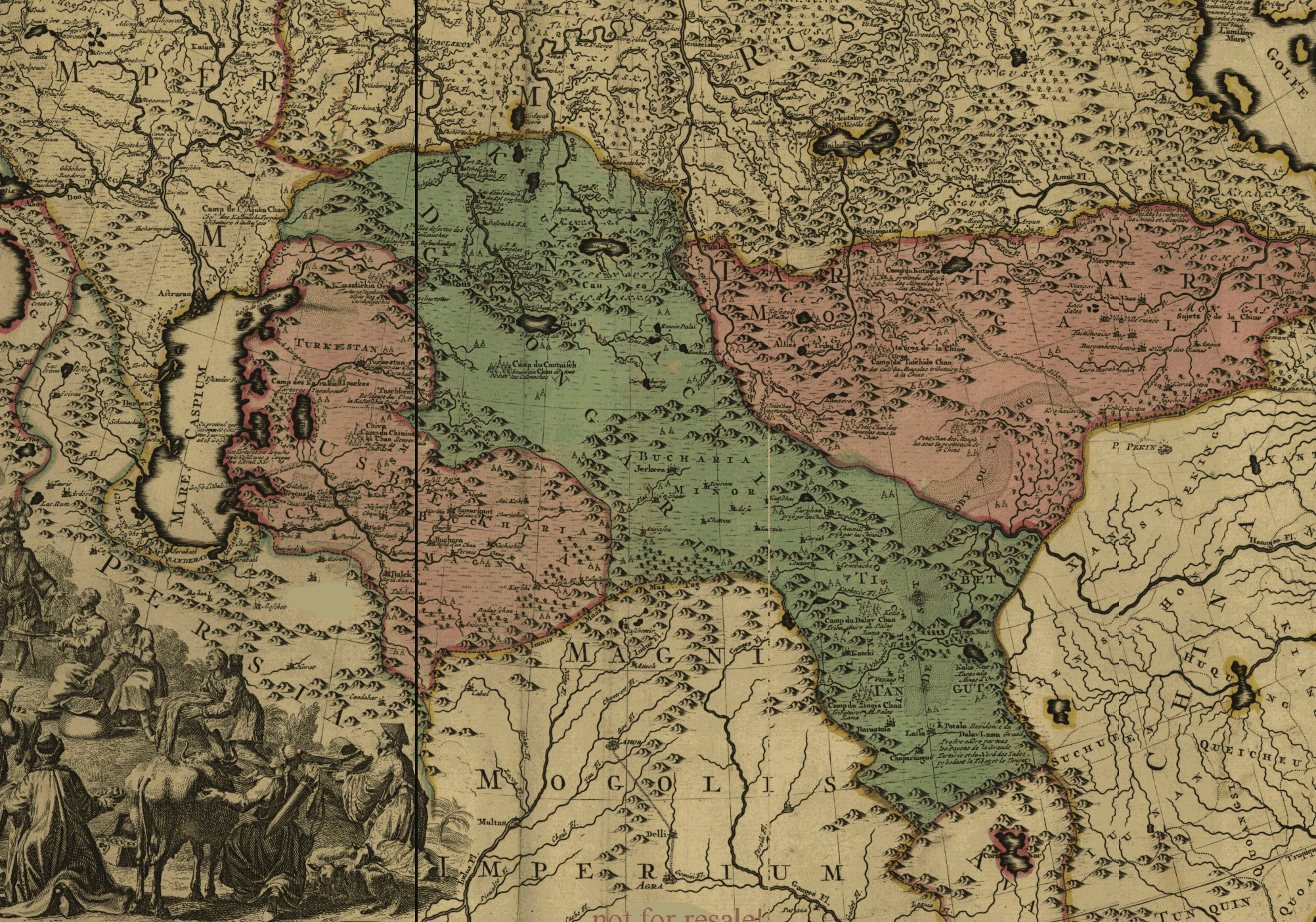
The Dzungar and Kalmyk states (a fragment of the map of the Russian Empire of Peter the Great, created by a Swedish soldier in c. 1725).

Amdo, meanwhile, became home to the Khoshuts. The descendants of Güshi Khan continued to rule as Dharma kings (chogyals) of Tibet, although they were eclipsed by the Dalai Lama and his regent for long periods. In 1717, however, the Dzungars, led by Tsewang Rabtan's brother Tsering Dondup, invaded Tibet. The invaders defeated and killed Lha-bzang Khan (the last khan of the Khoshut Khanate), a great-grandson of Güshi Khan and the fifth Dharma king of Tibet. The Dzungars deposed a pretender to the position of the Dalai Lama who had previously been promoted by Lha-bzang Khan. The 5th Dalai Lama had encouraged Mongolian lamas to prevent any non-dGe-lugs-pa teaching among the Mongols. The Dzungars soon began to loot Lhasa, thus losing initial Tibetan goodwill towards them. Many Nyingmapa and Bonpos were executed and Tibetans visiting Dzungar officials were forced to stick their tongues out so the Dzungars could tell if the person recited constant mantras (which was said to make the tongue black or brown). This allowed them to pick the Nyingmapa and Bonpos, who recited many magic-mantras. This habit of sticking one's tongue out as a mark of respect on greeting someone has remained a Tibetan custom until recent times.

The Dzungar invasion was a challenge to the imperial policy of the Kangxi Emperor, since Lha-bzang Khan had been allied to the Qing dynasty. The Emperor retaliated in 1718, but his military expedition suffered inadequate logistics and was annihilated by the Dzungars at the Battle of the Salween River not far from Lhasa. A second and larger expedition was dispatched by the Emperor and met with rapid success. The Manchus expelled Tsewang Rabtan's force from Tibet in 1720 and the troops were hailed as liberators. They brought Kälzang Gyatso with them from Kumbum to Lhasa and he was installed as the 7th Dalai Lama in 1721. In 1723 Lobzang Danjin, another descendant of Güshi Khan, defended Amdo against Qing dynasty's attempts to extend its rule into Tibet, but was crushed in the following year. Thus, Amdo fell under Chinese domination.

== See also ==
- Tibet under Yuan rule
- Khoshut Khanate
- Chinese expedition to Tibet (1720)
- Tibet under Qing rule
