= Gyurme Namgyal =

- Prince Xizang of the Second Rank

Prince Xizang of the Second Rank
- Reign: 1747–1750
- Predecessor: Polhané Sönam Topgyé
- Successor: title abolished
- Died: 11 November 1750; Lhasa
Regnal name
- Prince Xizang of the Second Rank (西藏郡王)

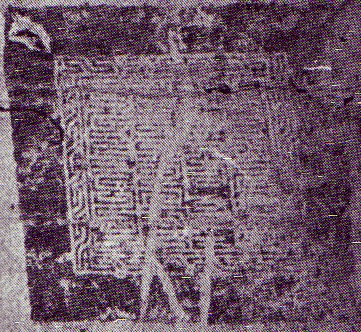
Seal of Gyurme Namgyel, Tibetan ruler (1747-1750)

Gyurme Namgyal (Tibetan: གྱུར་མེད་རྣམ་རྒྱལ, Wylie: Gyur med rnam rgyal; Chinese: 珠爾默特那木札勒) (died 11 November 1750) was a ruling prince of Tibet of the Pholha family. He was the son and successor of Polhané Sönam Topgyé and ruled from 1747 to 1750 during the period of Qing rule of Tibet. Gyurme Namgyal was murdered by the Manchu Ambans Fucin and Labdon in 1750. He was the last dynastic ruler of Tibet. After his death, in 1751, the Tibetan Ganden Phodrang government was taken over by the 7th Dalai Lama, Kelzang Gyatso. Thus began a new administrative order that would last for the next 150 years.

== Successor to the miwang Pholhané ==
Gyurme Namgyal, also known as Dalai Batur, was the second son of the Tibetan ruling prince (miwang) Pholhané Sönam Topgyé who ruled from 1728 to 1747. The natural heir to the title was actually his eldest son Gyurme Yeshe Tseten, who had been given jurisdiction over Ngari (West Tibet) in 1729. Gyurme Yeshe Tseten had gathered good experience during the civil war in 1727–1728, and had administrative experience through his governance in Ngari. However, his health deteriorated in the 1740s so that Pholhané excluded him from the succession. Moreover, his father did not approve of his view of life. Although he was married to two wives and sired several children, he mostly wore the garb of a lama and had very close relations with Buddhist clerics. His junior brother Gyurme Namgyal, on the other side, was the commander of the Tibetan army, kept a cavalry unit of several thousand Mongols, and had the outer appearance of a nobleman used to rule. He was apparently preferred by Pholhané on these grounds. After Pholhané had decided for Gyurme Namgyal, the imperial Qing court ratified the choice on 28 January 1746.

== Accession and conflict with his elder brother ==
When Pholhané died on 12 March 1747, Gyurme Namgyal succeeded without any commotion. The new ruler took over the governing staff of his father. In particular, Gashi Pandita Gonpo Ngodrub Rabten, a nephew of the political strongman Khangchenné (d. 1727), cooperated with him. Like his father, he had little regard for the Dalai Lama, and is usually depicted as a brutish figure in Tibetan historiography. Gyurme Namgyal's tenure of power was marked by his attempts to eliminate his brother Gyurme Yeshe Tseten who governed in Ngari. In 1748 he conceived a plan to dispatch an army for West Tibet and arrest the brother. This plan was abandoned, since it met with fierce opposition from his ministers. In this connection, he accused his brother before the Qianlong Emperor to suppress monasteries in Ngari, rob traders, and cut off trading routes with Central Tibet. As the imperial court did not react swiftly to these accusations, he sent a memorandum where he accused his brother of having captured a border town in Tsang with 700 men.

As Gyurme Yeshe Tseten suddenly died on 25 January 1750, Gyurme Namgyal spread the news that his brother had died from a sickness, and had costly death rituals carried out for him. Later, after the murder of Gyurme Namgyal by the ambans, the Chinese spread the assumption that the ruler had assassinated his elder brother. The conflict between the brothers should be seen from the background that Gyurme Namgyal found it difficult to act against the Chinese military presence in Lhasa if there was a pro-Chinese military power in West Tibet. It was only after the death of Gyurme Yeshe Tseten that Gyurme Namgyal made concrete preparations to deal with the ambans.

== Conflict with the Chinese suzerain ==
The policy of Gyurme Namgyal was actually fundamentally anti-Chinese. His political aim was to make way for an abrogation of the Chinese suzerainty. In 1748 he cunningly persuaded the Chinese emperor to reduce the Chinese garrison in Lhasa from 500 to 100 men. Since there was a professional Tibetan army of 25,000, which however was spread over the country, this meant that the Chinese ambans in Lhasa were as good as unprotected. In 1747/48 the Qianlong Emperor permitted a Dzungar embassy to travel to Tibet. The envoys arrived to Lhasa at the end of January 1748 and were received with celebrations. The contacts they made with Gyurme Namgyal meant that he could maintain written communication with Dzungaria and call for the Dzungars to march to Tibet via Ladakh. The ambans received news of the preparations of Gyurme Namgyal on 19 July 1750: 1,500 Tibetan troops were to arrive to Lhasa with 49 loads of munitions to be stationed there. Shortly afterwards Gyurme Namgyal gathered 2,000 regular troops under his command. In November 1750 he ordered to impede the use that the Chinese made of the Tibetan postal system, so that the ambans could not communicate with the court in China.

== The murder of the prince ==
At the same time Gyurme Namgyal went to Lhasa. He was not aware that his plans had been revealed to the Chinese by pro-Qing Tibetans. The ambans, who rightly feared for their lives, invited the ruler to the Chinese residence under the pretext of holding a conference. The unsuspecting Gyurme Namgyal arrived with his entourage and was shown to a separate room where the deliberation was to be held. Here, Fucing confronted him with a number of grave accusations. Before the ruler could reply, Fucing jumped up and held his arm while Labdon pierced him with his sword. Meanwhile, the retainers who waited in the hall were cut down as well. The only person who survived was the chief groom of Gyurme Namgyal, Lobsang Tashi, who saved his life by jumping through a window. He started a brief rising against the Chinese where Fucing, Labdon and many other Chinese were killed. He then tried to escape to Dzungaria with two dozen followers but was caught. In January 1751 the Manchu officer Bandi arrived to Lhasa and investigated the affair. Lobsang Tashi and twelve other Tibetans were executed, and shortly afterwards the Dalai Lama received full spiritual and temporal powers over Tibet.

== See also ==
- Tibet under Qing rule
- History of Tibet

== Literature ==
- Luciano Petech, China and Tibet in the Early XVIIIth Century. History of the Establishment of Chinese Protecturate in Tibet. 2nd rev. edition. Leiden: Brill, 1972 (Tʿoung pao Monographie 1).
- Luciano Petech, Aristocracy and Government in Tibet. 1728-1959. Rome: Istituto Italiano per il Medio ed Estremo Oriente, 1973 (Serie Orientale Roma 45).
- Sam Van Schaik, Tibet. A history. New Haven & London: Yale University Press, 2011.
- Dieter Schuh, Grundlagen tibetischer Siegelkunde. Eine Untersuchung über tibetische Siegelaufschriften in ’Phags-pa-Schrift. Sankt Augustin: VGH-Wissenschaftsverlag (Monumenta Tibetica historica 3, 5).
- Tsepon W.D. Shakabpa, Tibet: A political history. New York: Yale, 1967.
- Ya Hanzhang, Biographies of the Tibetan Spiritual Leaders Panchen Erdenis. Beijing: Foreign Language Press, 1994.

Preceded by Polhané Sönam Topgyé	Ruling prince of Tibet (Qing overlordship); 1747–1750	Succeeded by Administration of the 7th Dalai Lama
