= Lhasa riot of 1750 =

Uprising against Qing rule in Tibet

- Date: 1750
- Location: Tibet
- Result: Riot quelled

Parties
Qing dynasty	Tibetan rebels

Lead figures
Fuqing †; Labdun †; Ts'ereng	Lobsang Trashi (executed)

The Lhasa riot of 1750 or Lhasa uprising of 1750 took place in the Tibetan capital Lhasa, and lasted several days during the period of the Qing dynasty's patronage in Tibet. The uprising began on 11 November 1750 after the expected new regent of Tibet, Gyurme Namgyal, was assassinated by two Chinese diplomats, or ambans. As a result, both ambans were murdered, and 51 Qing soldiers and 77 Chinese citizens were killed in the uprising. A year later the leader of the rebellion, Lobsang Trashi, and fourteen other rebels were executed by Qing officials.

== Origins of the riot ==
Pholhanas, the regent of Tibet, died in February 1747, during his time in office the country had enjoyed a relatively tranquil period, still, he had had discords with the Dalai Lama and news of them had reached Beijing after 1745. The ambans had mediated some of these conflicts, but the relations between them remained tense. In 1746 the Dalai Lama secretly sent a mission to Beijing to complain to the Emperor about Pholhanas treatment to him.

After Pholhanas' death, he was succeeded by his second son, Gyurme Namgyal, as regent. The new regent also maintained bad relations with the Dalai Lama, he even rejected the Dalai Lama's offer to sing sutras in the funerary ceremony in honor of his father. Fuqing mediated and the prince later agreed to the Dalai Lama's offer. Relations with the Qing also soured, because the Manchus suspected that the Tibetan prince was working to isolate the Dalai Lama from his followers while also preparing to militarily prevent a Qing intervention. Gyurme Namgyal even killed his brother, Gyumey Tseten, who was more pro-Qing.

The Manchus believed that the prince had sent an envoy to the Dzungars, who rivaled the Qing control of Tibet.

== Assassination of Gyurme Namgyal ==
The ambans Fuqing and Labdon decided to act before the prince had a chance to rebel, the emperor's withdrawal of the garrison of Lhasa had deprived them of a physical means with which enforce their authority so they decided on a bold plan. On 11 November 1750 the prince was back in Lhasa, and the ambans summoned him to a conference in their office, the house that had been the residence of Lha-bzang Khan the last Khoshut King of Tibet, to assassinate him.

When Gyurme Namgyal was killed, Lobsang Trashi, a chamberlain, was in a small separate room but heard what happened. After killing the regent, all the guards searched the place for the members of Gyurme Namgyal's entourage, but Lobsang Trashi managed to escape by jumping through a window.

Immediately after the murder, the ambans sent a messenger to Minister Gashi Pandita, asking him to take over as head of the Tibetan government. The minister looked bewildered but asked first the Dalai Lama for advice. While the Tibetan government deliberated the streets of Lhasa broke into a storm of riots.

== The uprising ==
Immediately after his escape from the residence of the ambans, Lobsang Trashi spread the news about the murder of the regent. In a short time, a crowd of over a thousand armed men of the city, gathered very excited outside the residence of the ambans. Gashi Pandita had no opportunity to intervene, because they were no regular Tibetan troops in Lhasa.

The Dalai Lama sent some of his secretaries at the crowd to urge them to calm themselves and avoid taking violent actions. The main official of the Gelug order, Reting Rinpoche Ngawang Chokden, personally tried in vain to hold back the crowd.

The crowd besieged and burned the residence of the ambans. Fuqing, injured with multiple stab wounds, committed suicide. Labdon died while fighting with the rebels. The 49 Qing soldiers and two officers who defended the residence, were also killed. Next, the crowd targeted the treasury of the Qing army where they captured 85,000 taels.

After that, the anger of the crowd was directed against the Chinese citizens living in Lhasa, and 77 of them lost their life to the angry mob. The remaining Chinese, approximately 200, fled to safety in the Potala Palace, where they were offered refuge and assistance.

== End of the rebellion ==
The riot ended as suddenly as it broke out. The rebels found no support from the Tibetan nobility and members of the government. Both groups were opposed to the policies of Gyurme Namgyal, and believed that challenging the Manchu superpower could only end in a military catastrophe.

The Dalai Lama, who headed the Gelug order had continued to deal with the many Tibetan monasteries of his order in eastern Tibet and Mongolia. His concern was in first place for its religious institutions, and the powerful Manchu Emperors were patrons of Tibetan Buddhism.

Two days after the death of Gyurme Namgyal and ambans, on 13 November, the Dalai Lama appointed his minister Gashi Pandita as provisional regent. He was asked the government to lead the entry of final orders of the emperor. At the same time, he issued a proclamation in which he forbade all Tibetans Trashi Lobsang and his supporters to support.

Lobsang Trashi fled with his followers Lhasa in order to get hold of the money Dzjoengarije to settle. On 21 November 1750, Gashi Pandita did the Dalai Lama Lobsang Trashi and that fourteen of his followers were taken down. Likewise, much of the looted money secured. On 22 November, the situation had become so quiet that the Chinese refugees in their homes could return to Lhasa.

== Qianlong's expedition to Lhasa ==
At the beginning of 1750, provincial officials in Sichuan had been in on alert and were considering a preemptive invasion before the prince made his move.

The news of the murder of the ambans outraged the Qing Qianlong Emperor, and he decided to take swift military action. The initial orders to the commandants in Shanxi and Sichuan was to lead a column of 8,000 men and 5,000 men respectively, but after the Emperor got news from the Dalai Lama that the rebellion was quelled he reduced the expeditionary force to 800 soldiers under General Cereng.

The Qing general, Ban Di, entered the city on 18 January 1751, as the first representative of the Emperor to arrive to Lhasa after the riot and he came with a personal escort from Kokonor, where he had been the Imperial representative. Upon entering, he immediately demanded the surrender of the insurgents. Ban Di was greeted by Pandita and handed over the prisoners involved in the riot. After a brief interrogation through torture he sentenced Lobsang Trashi to be executed. The Dalai Lama request for a lenient sentence was in vain.

Luciano Petech described the end of the insurgents as follows:

"On January 23, 1751 Lhasa was similar to 1728, again witnessed another horrible example of Chinese justice. Lobsang Trashi and six other leaders of the rebellion were by executed by cutting them into pieces. Other people were beheaded or strangled. The heads of the executed were punctured and bars the public display. The other leaders were exiled and their property taken away."

— Luciano Petech (1972) China and Tibet in the Early XVIIIth Century, p. 225

On 23 January 1751, Tibetan rebels who participated in the Lhasa riot of 1750 against the Qing were sliced to death by Qing Manchu general Bandi, similar to what happened on 1 November 1728. 6 Tibetan rebel leaders plus Tibetan rebel leader Blo-bzan-bkra-sis were sliced to death. The rest of the Tibetan rebel leaders were strangled and beheaded and their heads were displayed to the Tibetan public on poles. The Qing seized the property of the rebels and exiled other Tibetan rebels. Manchu General Bandi sent a report to the Qing Qianlong emperor on 26 January 1751 on how he carried out the slicings and executions of the Tibetan rebels. The Tibetan rebels dBan-rgyas (Wang-chieh), Padma-sku-rje-c'os-a['el (Pa-t'e-ma-ku-erh-chi-ch'un-p'i-lo) and Tarqan Yasor (Ta-erh-han Ya-hsün) were sliced to death for injuring the Manchu ambans with arrows, bows and fowling pieces during the Lhasa riot when they assault the building the Manchu ambans (Labdon and Fuqing) were in. Tibetan rebel Sacan Hasiha (Ch'e-ch'en-ha-shih-ha) was sliced to death for murder of multiple individuals. Tibetan rebelsCh'ui-mu-cha-t'e and Rab-brtan (A-la-pu-tan) were sliced to death for looting money and setting fire during the attack on the Ambans. Tibetan rebel Blo-bzan-bkra-sis, the mgron-gner was sliced to death for being the overall leader of the rebels who led the attack which looted money and killed the Manchu ambans. Two Tibetan rebels who had already died before the execution had their dead bodies beheaded, one died in jail, Lag-mgon-po (La-k'o-kun-pu) and the other killed himself since he was scared of the punishment, Pei-lung-sha-k'o-pa. Bandi sentenced to strangulation several rebel followers and bKra-sis-rab-brtan (Cha-shih-la-pu-tan) a messenger. He ordered the live beheadings of Man-chin Te-shih-nai and rDson-dpon dBan-rgyal (Ts'eng-pen Wang-cha-lo and P'yag-mdsod-pa Lha-skyabs (Shang-cho-t'e-pa La-cha-pu) for leading the attack on the building by being the first to go to on the staircase to the next floor and setting fire and carrying the straw to fuel the fire besides killing several men on orders from the rebel leader.

=== Previous similar executions ===
On 1 November 1728, after the Qing reconquest of Lhasa in Tibet, several Tibetan rebels were sliced to death by Qing Manchu officers and officials in front of the Potala Palace in Lhasa. The Qing Manchu President of the Board of Civil Office, Jalangga, Mongol sub-chancellor Sen-ge and brigadier-general Manchu Mala ordered the Tibetan rebels Lum-pa-nas and Na-p'od-pa to be sliced to death. They ordered gZims-dpon C'os-ac'ad (Hsi-mu-pen ch'ui-cha-t'e), son of Lum-pa-nas and rNog Tarqan bsKal-bzajn-c'os-adar and dKon-mc'og-lha-sgrub (Kun-ch'u-k'o-la-ku-pu) and dGa'-ldan-p'un-ts'ogs (K'a-erh-tan-p'en-ch'u-k'o), sons of Na-p'od-pa to be beheaded. Byams-pa (Cha-mu-pa) and his brother Lhag-gsan (La-k'o-sang) and their brothers, younger and older, daughters, wives and mother were exiled after their father sByar-ra-nas was beheaded. The Manchus wrote that they "set an example" by forcing the Tibetans to publicly watch the executions of Tibetan rebels of slicing like Na-p'od-pa since they said it was the Tibetan's nature to be cruel. The exiled Tibetans were enslaved and given as slaves to soldiers in Ching-chou (Jingzhou), K'ang-zhou (Kangzhou) and Chiang-ning (Jiangning) in the marshall-residences there. The Tibetan rNam-rgyal-grva-ts'an college administrator (gner-adsin) and sKyor'lun Lama were tied together with Lum-pa-nas and Na-p'od-pa on 4 scaffolds (k'rims-sin) to be sliced. The Manchus used musket matchlocks to fire 3 salvoes and then the Manchus strangled the 2 Lamas while slicing (Lingchi) Lum-pa-nas and Na-p'od-pa to death while they beheaded the 13 other rebels leaders. The Tibetan population was depressed by the scene and the writer of MBTJ continued to feel sad as he described it 5 years later. All relatives of the Tibetan rebels including little children were executed by the Qing Manchus except the exiled and deported family of sByar-ra-ba which was condemned to be slaves and most exiles sentenced to deportation died in the process of deportation. The public executions spectacle worked on the Tibetans since they were "cowed into submission" by the Qing. Even the Tibetan collaborator with the Qing, Polhané Sönam Topgyé (P'o-lha-nas) felt sad at his fellow Tibetans being executed in this manner and he prayed for them. All of this was included in a report sent to the Qing emperor at the time, the Yongzheng Emperor.

Qing Han Chinese general Yue Zhongqi interviewed the Tibetan collaborator with the Qing, Polhané Sönam Topgyé (P'o-lha-nas) concerning his involvement in crushing the Tibetan rebels and sent a report to the Qing Yongzheng emperor on 17 August 1728.

== See also ==
- Tibet under Qing rule
- Xinhai Lhasa turmoil
