= Tibet under Qing rule =

Tibetan history from 1720-1912

- Protectorate and territory of the Qing dynasty
- 1720–1912
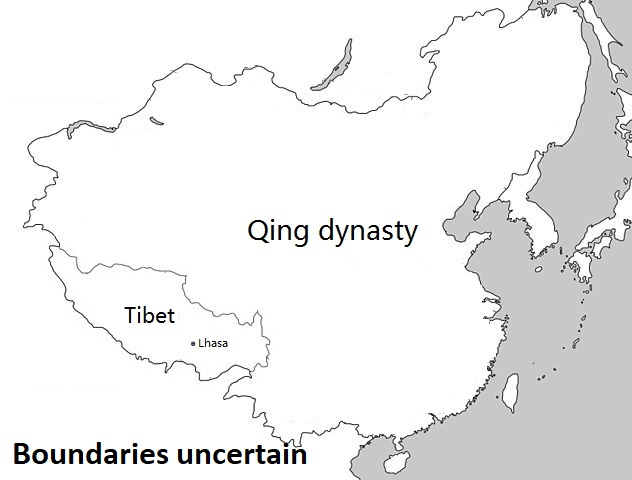
- Tibet within the Qing dynasty in 1820.
- Capital: Lhasa
- Demonym: Tibetan
  - Type: Buddhist Theocracy headed by Dalai Lama or regents under Qing protectorate
- History
  - Chinese expedition to Tibet: 1720
  - Tibetan border established at Dri River: 1725–1726
  - Lhasa uprising of 1750: 1750
  - Sino-Nepalese War: 1788–1792
  - British invasion of Tibet: 1903–1904
  - Qing sent army for establishing direct rule: 1910–1911
  - Surrender of Qing residents: 1912
Preceded by	Succeeded by
Dzungar Khanate	Tibet; Tibet Area

The Qing dynasty, led by the Manchus, ruled Tibet from 1720 to 1912. The Qing called Tibet a fanbu, fanbang or fanshu, which has usually been translated as "vassal", "vassal state", or "borderlands", along with many of its other Inner Asian territories. Like the earlier Mongol-led Yuan dynasty, the Qing dynasty exerted military and administrative control over Tibet while granting it a degree of political autonomy. The extent of its control over the region has been the subject of political debate.

By 1642, Güshi Khan of the Khoshut Khanate had reunified Tibet under the spiritual and temporal authority of the 5th Dalai Lama of the Gelug school, who established a civil administration known as Ganden Phodrang. In 1653, the Dalai Lama travelled on a state visit to the Qing court, and was received in Beijing and "recognized as the spiritual authority of the Qing Empire". The Dzungar Khanate invaded Tibet in 1717 and was subsequently expelled by the Qing in 1720. The Qing emperors then appointed imperial residents known as ambans to Tibet, most of them ethnic Manchus, that reported to the Lifan Yuan, a Qing government body that oversaw the empire's frontier. During the Qing era, Lhasa was politically semi-autonomous under the Dalai Lamas or regents. Qing authorities engaged in occasional military interventions in Tibet, intervened in Tibetan frontier defense, collected tribute, stationed troops, and influenced reincarnation selection through the Golden Urn. About half of the Tibetan lands were exempted from Lhasa's administrative rule and annexed into neighboring Chinese provinces, although most were only nominally subordinated to Beijing.

By the late 19th century, Chinese hegemony over Tibet only existed in theory, and Britain invaded Tibet in 1903–1904. Russia was also competing for influence in Tibet, and the two powers signed the 1907 Anglo-Russian Convention recognizing Qing suzerainty of Tibet, although Qing China had used the term "sovereignty" to describe its position and later sent an army to Tibet for establishing direct rule in 1910. The dynasty was overthrown by revolutionaries in 1911–1912. The 13th Dalai Lama returned to Lhasa in 1913 and ruled a de facto independent Tibet until his death in 1933.

== Political status ==
The political status of Tibet during the Qing period has been described as a "Chinese protectorate," a "Qing protectorate," a "Manchu protectorate," a "subordinate place... within the Qing Empire," a "part of an empire," a "vassal state," a "dependent state," and a "tributary or a dependency." Western historians such as Goldstein, Elliot Sperling, and Jaques Gernet have described Tibet during the Qing period as a protectorate, vassal state, tributary, or something similar. Tibet was referred to by the Qing as a fanbu (Chinese: 藩部), fanbang (Chinese: 藩邦) or fanshu (simplified Chinese: 藩属; traditional Chinese: 藩屬), which has usually been translated as "vassal" or "vassal state". As a fanshu it fell under the jurisdiction of the Lifan Yuan, which also oversaw Mongolia. Chinese authorities referred to Tibet as a vassal state up until the 1950s, and then as an "integral" part of China.

According to Jaques Gernet, the Qing gained a firm hold over Tibet in 1751, although as a protectorate, Tibet retained a large amount of internal authority. Melvyn Goldstein states there is "no question" that Tibet was subordinate to the Qing dynasty following the first decades of the 18th century. Meanwhile, Elliot Sperling says that after the Sino-Nepalese War (1788–1792), Tibet's subordination to the Qing was "beyond dispute" and that one of the memoirs of a Tibetan minister involved in the war states unambiguously that he was a subject of the Qing emperor. The Golden Urn system of selecting reincarnations was instituted by the Qing, and real authority over Tibet was wielded by its offices and officials. However, for most of the 19th century this authority was weak. After the death of the 8th Dalai Lama, Jamphel Gyatso in 1804, the Dalai Lamas did not exercise any real power for the next 70 years, during which monk regents reigned with the support of the Qing. In terms of foreign recognition, Britain and Russia formally acknowledged Chinese authority over Tibet in treaties of 1906 and 1907. This was after the 1904 British expedition to Tibet stirred China into becoming more directly involved in Tibetan affairs and working to integrate Tibet with "the rest of China." In 1910, the Qing reasserted control over Tibet by occupying Lhasa and deposing the 13th Dalai Lama. The Qing dynasty was overthrown in the Xinhai revolution the next year, and the Republic of China lacked the ability to continue the occupation. The 13th Dalai Lama returned to Lhasa in 1913 and ruled an independent Tibet until his death in 1933.

The de facto independent Tibetan government (1912–1951) and Tibetan exiles promote the status of independent nation, with only a "priest and patron" relationship between the Dalai Lama and the Qing emperor. There are varying interpretations of the patron and priest relationship, a Tibetan political theory that the relationship between Tibet and China was a symbiotic link between a spiritual leader and a lay patron, such as the relationship between the Dalai Lama and the Qing emperor. They were respectively spiritual teacher and lay patron, rather than subject and lord. Chöyön is an abbreviation of two Tibetan words: chöney, "that which is worthy of being given gifts and alms" (for example, a lama or a deity), and yöndag, "he who gives gifts to that which is worthy" (a patron). During the 1913 Simla Conference, the 13th Dalai Lama's negotiators cited the priest and patron relationship to explain the lack of any clearly demarcated boundary between Tibet and the rest of China (i.e. as a religious benefactor, the Qing did not need to be hedged against).

There are also different interpretations of titles and symbolic gestures between Tibetan and Qing authorities. The 13th Dalai Lama, for example, knelt, but did not kowtow, before the Empress Dowager Cixi and the young Emperor while he delivered his petition in Beijing. Chinese sources emphasize the submission of kneeling; Tibetan sources emphasize the lack of the kowtow. Titles and commands given to Tibetans by the Chinese, likewise, are variously interpreted. The Qing authorities gave the 13th Dalai Lama the title of "Loyally Submissive Vice-Regent", and ordered to follow Qing commands and communicate with the emperor only through the Manchu amban in Lhasa; but opinions vary as to whether these titles and commands reflected actual political power, or symbolic gestures ignored by Tibetans. Some authors claim that kneeling before the Emperor followed the 17th-century precedent in the case of the 5th Dalai Lama. Other historians indicate that the emperor treated the Dalai Lama as an equal.

According to Sperling, the description of a "priest-patron" religious relationship governing Sino-Tibetan relations that excluded concrete political subordination is a recent phenomenon and not substantiated. The priest and patron relationship coexisted with Tibet's political subordination to the Yuan and Qing dynasties, despite Tibetan exile commentators having come to believe that this political subordination was a misunderstanding. Sperling describes this as a "cultural notion at work as a national idea is defined anew." Tibetan interaction with the West, assimilation of modern ideals about Tibet, and the goal of cultural preservation increasingly centered discussion of Tibet around its religious and spiritual significance. This impetus to formulate a Tibetan identity based primarily on religion has made understanding the political realities of Tibet's relationship to the Mongol Yuan and Manchu Qing dynasty difficult.

== Government ==
=== Regent ===
From 1721 to 1727, Tibet was governed by Khangchenné, who led the Tibetan cabinet known as the Kashag under close supervision of the Chinese garrison commander stationed in Lhasa. From 1728 to 1750, Tibet was a monarchy led by the princes or kings Polhané Sönam Topgyé and Gyurme Namgyal under the supervision of the Qing ambans. The regents of Tibet after 1727 were recognized by the Chinese as wang (prince) but as "king" by European missionaries. Both Polhané and Gyurme were de facto rulers of Tibet who exercised power in their own name and authority without reference to the Dalai Lama. Their post was hereditary. The Kashag was merely an executive organ and provincial administration was controlled by the nominees of the rulers. Compulsory transport service was a monopoly of the regent. After 1750, the hereditary office was abolished, and regents (gyeltsap) became temporary offices again. They were appointed to oversee the government, under the supervision of the ambans, before the Dalai Lama reached the age of majority in his 18th year.

=== Dalai Lama ===
When the Qing dynasty installed the 7th Dalai Lama in 1720, his religious supremacy was recognized by the Tibetan government, but the Qing ignored his theoretical rights. After 1720, the government was appointed by the Qing but due to distance and bad organization, retained a large amount of internal authority. After the civil war of 1727–1728, the 7th Dalai Lama was suspected of complicity in the murder of Khangchenné, who led the Tibetan cabinet, and was exiled to Gartar Monastery in Kham. All temporal authority was wielded by Polhané Sönam Topgyé in the meantime. After the events of 1750 in which the 7th Dalai Lama managed to quell the riots caused by the death of Polhané's successor at the hands of the Qing ambans, the Qianlong Emperor of the Qing dynasty promulgated the 13-Article Ordinance for the More Effective Governing of Tibet, granting the 7th Dalai Lama secular power. At the same time, the powers of the Qing ambans in Lhasa were also greatly increased. The 7th Dalai Lama then conducted government with some degree of control by the Qing.

According to The Veritable Records of the Shizong [Yongzheng] Emperor and in the Weizang tuzhi [ Topographical Description of Central Tibet ], the Dalai Lama's powers after 1751 included overseeing important decisions by ministers and appointing district governors, provincial governors, and officers based on the recommendations of the council with the approval of the ambans.

The 8th, 9th, 10th, 11th, and 12th Dalai Lamas from 1758 to 1875 were unimportant or died young. The 13th Dalai Lama (1875–1933) fled to Urga during the British occupation of Lhasa in 1904. With the resulting treaty in 1906 recognizing China's suzerainty over Tibet, the 13th Dalai Lama visited Beijing in 1908 where he tried unsuccessfully to gain a greater degree of independence for Tibet. The Qing forces occupied Lhasa in 1910 and the 13th Dalai Lama fled to India. The Qing dynasty fell the next year and its forces withdrew from Tibet. In 1913, the 13th Dalai Lama returned to Lhasa and declared himself sovereign of an independent Tibet which he ruled until his death in 1933.

=== Kashag ===
The Kashag was a council of four ministers called kalön. The council existed between 1642 and 1705/6 but very little is known about its activity. Under Lha-bzang Khan the Kashag had little power and was composed of only Mongols to the exclusion of Tibetans. In 1721, the Qing removed the indigenous civil government that had existed in Lhasa and replaced the sde srid (civil administrator/regent) with the Kashag. The council was to govern Tibet under the close supervision of the Chinese garrison commander stationed in Lhasa, who quite often interfered with the decisions of the Kashag, especially when Chinese interests were involved. However, its members were composed of Tibetan nobles whose territorial ambitions caused the council to stop functioning, resulting in civil war in 1727–1728. The council was reconstituted again in 1728 as the executive organ of the regent. Each kalön was directly responsible to the regent. In the latter part of Polhané's reign they ceased to have meetings. After the Lhasa riot of 1750, the Qianlong Emperor sent an army to Tibet and reorganized the Tibetan government in 1751 with the 13-Article Ordinance for the More Effective Governing of Tibet. The council was reconstituted as a collective administration where all decisions were to be taken only with common agreement.

=== Amban ===
The office of the two Ambans was set up in 1728. They were imperial residents of the Qing dynasty and reported to the Qing government agency known as the Lifan Yuan. Prior to that there were no permanent representatives of the Qing emperor in Tibet and the temporary representative after 1720 was withdrawn in 1723. Between 1723 and 1728, there were special missions to Lhasa but no permanent residence. The fact that two ambans with their Chinese garrison have been stationed in Lhasa since 1728 is significant because it shows that Manchu China had effectively taken over the position of the former Mongol protector of the lamaist regime. There was a senior and junior amban but the distinction was purely formal and they both held the same authority. Between the death of A'erxun in 1734 and 1748, there was only one amban. The first two ambans, Sengge and Mala, held office for five years, but thereafter ambans held office for a maximum of three years. During the rule of Polhané, the ambans' duties mainly consisted of commanding the Qing garrison and communications with Beijing on the actions of the Tibetan ruler. During the initial period they sometimes intervened in matters of foreign relations but they never interfered with the Tibetan government at that time. In 1751, the power of the ambans was increased. Besides their former duties, their directions also had to be taken by the Kashag on every important matter, giving them broad supervision over the Tibetan government. Direct intervention by the ambans was still a rare occurrence until after the Sino-Nepalese War in 1792. By 1793, the ambans were accorded the same rank as the Dalai and Panchen Lamas, and these two high-ranking Lamas were denied the traditional right of communicating directly with the Emperor; they could only do so via the ambans. By this time the ambans were also above the Kashag and regents in regards to Tibetan political affairs. Over a period of 184 years, the amban's status changed from consultative to supervisory and finally to commanding official in Lhasa. The staff of the ambans included one or two military officers and several clerics. The clerics' function was probably similar to that of secretaries. After 1751, a number of Manchu banner officers were added.

== History ==
=== Background ===
==== Khoshut Khanate ====
Tibet had been ruled by a joint Gelug Yellow Hat sect and Khoshut Khanate government since 1642. The Khoshut Mongols were originally part of the Oirats. The Khoshut chief Toro-Baikhu won a power struggle against his uterine brother Chöükür in 1630, after which he named himself "Dai Güshi" Taiji. A few years later, the Gelug Yellow Hat sect's 5th Dalai Lama called him to come to their aid against Choghtu Khong Tayiji, a Khalkha Mongol khan who aided their rivals, the Karmapa and Bon sects. The Oirats had already supported the Gelug since 1616 so Güshi was able to utilize their religious affiliation as call to arms. Shortly following a visit to Tibet in 1635, Güshi led a 10,000 strong army into Kokonor and killed Choghtu. In 1637, the 5th Dalai Lama bestowed upon Güshi the title of khan, the first non-Genghisid Mongol to claim the title. A mass migration of 100,000 Oirats to Kokonor ensued. By 1642, Güshi had defeated the king of Beri, Donyo Dorje, and the ruler of Tsangpa, Karma Tenkyong, uniting Tibet under the Gelug. On 13 April 1642, The 5th Dalai Lama proclaimed Güshi the khan of Tibet on 13 April 1642.

A governing body known as the Ganden Phodrang, named after the 5th Dalai Lama's residence in Drepung Monastery, was set up as a Gelug led government of Tibet in 1642. However, there are various interpretations of the nature of the Khoshut Khanate's relationship with the government of Tibet under the Gelug. Some sources say that the khan had very little to do with the administration of Tibet and only maintained a priest and patron relationship with the Dalai Lama. Other sources describe Mongol representatives of the khan in Tibet while he ruled in Kokonor and treated Tibet as a protectorate. One source states that Güshi sat on a lower level than the Dalai Lama during the enthronement ceremony in 1642 but the Dalai Lama was merely a figurehead until the death of the governor, Sonam Rapten, in 1657. This is implied by descriptions in other sources of an increase in "day-to-day control of... his government" by the 5th Dalai Lama after the deaths of Sonam Rapten and Güshi. One interpretation describes the granting of all temporal powers over Tibet to the Dalai Lama, but he did not possess the power to actually administrate. An office called desi was created to carry out government while the Dalai Lama was restricted to appealing the judicial decisions of the desi, although eventually the Dalai Lama did assert his power over the government by appointing the desi. In this interpretation, the Khoshut khans had no say in government until the coup of 1705–6. Another source claims that the de facto administrator of civil affairs, Sonam Rapten, was selected by the khan while the Dalai Lama was relegated to religious affairs.

==== Relations with the early Qing dynasty ====
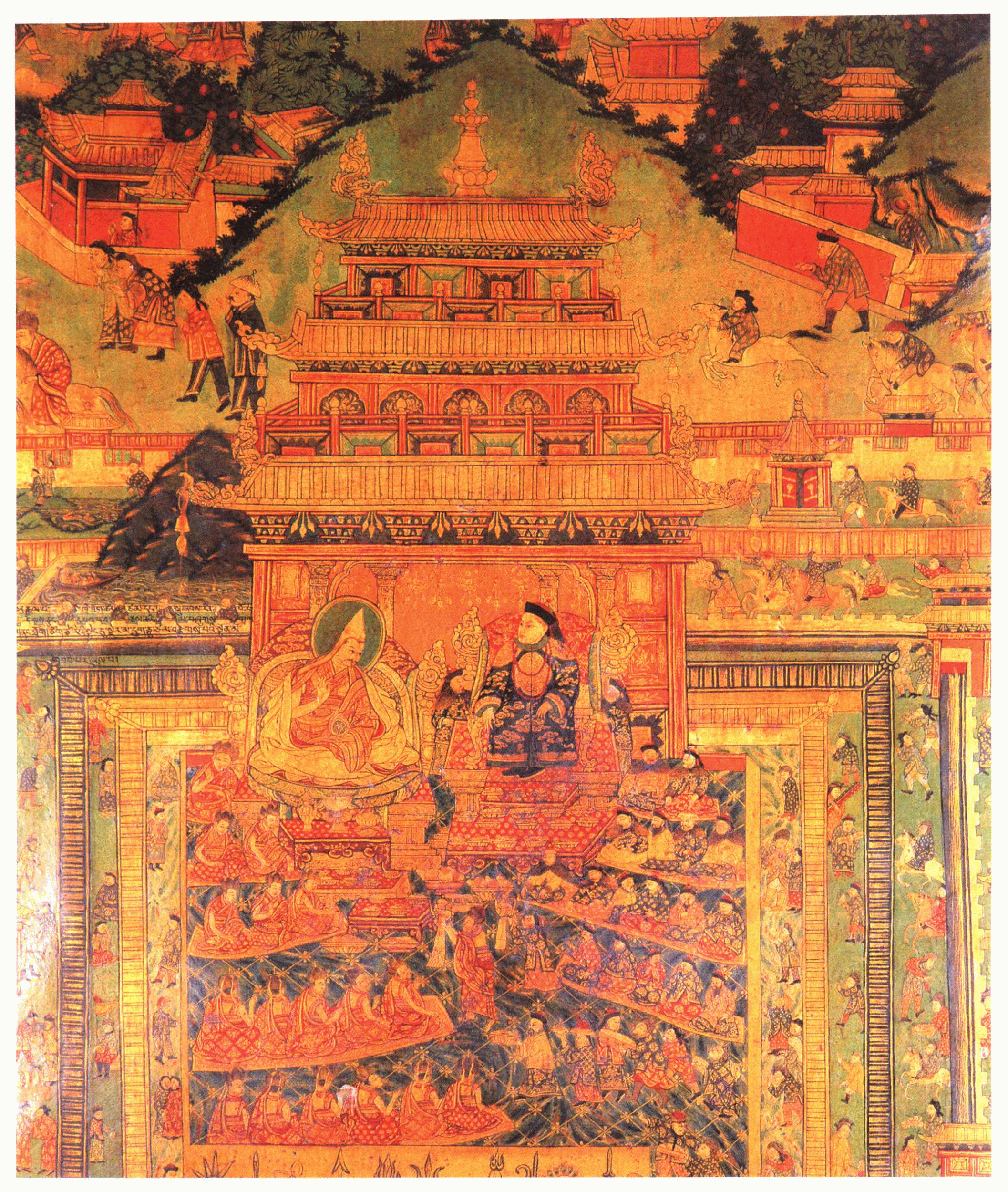
Potala Palace painting of the 5th Dalai Lama meeting the Shunzhi Emperor in Beijing, 1653.

In 1653, the 5th Dalai Lama visited the Qing dynasty's Shunzhi Emperor in Beijing. According to Chinese sources, the emperor received the Dalai Lama in the South Park and gave him a seat and a feast. They Dalai Lama offered gifts involving local products. The visit was not characterized as a court summon. According to the autobiography of the 5th Dalai Lama, the emperor descended from his throne and took his hand. The Dalai Lama sat on a seat close to the emperor and at nearly the same height. The emperor requested the Dalai Lama drink first but they drank together after some deliberation. The emperor bestowed upon him gifts fit for a "Teacher of the Emperor". The Dalai Lama was "recognized as the spiritual authority of the Qing Empire".

In 1674, the Kangxi Emperor asked the Dalai Lama to send Mongol troops to help suppress Wu Sangui's Revolt of the Three Feudatories in Yunnan. The Dalai Lama refused to send troops, and advised Kangxi to resolve the conflict in Yunnan by dividing China with Wu Sangui. The Dalai Lama openly professed neutrality but he exchanged gifts and letters with Wu Sangui during the war further deepening the Qing's suspicions and angering them against the Dalai Lama. This was a turning point for Kangxi, who began to deal with the Mongols directly, rather than through the Dalai Lama.

In 1677, the Tibetan government formalized the frontier between Tibet and China with Kham ascribed to Tibet's authority.

The 5th Dalai Lama died in 1682. His regent, Desi Sangye Gyatso, concealed his death and continued to act in his name. In 1688, Galdan Boshugtu Khan of the Dzungar Khanate defeated the Khalkha Mongols and went on to battle Qing forces. This contributed to the loss of Tibet's role as mediator between the Mongols and the Qing emperor. Several Khalkha tribes formally submitted directly to Kangxi. Galdan retreated to Dzungaria. When Sangye Gyatso complained to Kangxi that he could not control the Mongols of Kokonor in 1693, Kangxi annexed Kokonor, giving it the name it bears today, Qinghai. He also annexed Tachienlu in eastern Kham at this time. When Kangxi finally destroyed Galdan in 1696, a Qing ruse involving the name of the Dalai Lama was involved; Galdan blamed the Dalai Lama for his ruin, still not aware of his death fourteen years earlier.

About this time, some Dzungars informed Kangxi that the 5th Dalai Lama had long since died. He sent envoys to Lhasa to inquire. This prompted Sangye Gyatso to make Tsangyang Gyatso, the 6th Dalai Lama, public. He was enthroned in 1697. Tsangyang Gyatso enjoyed a lifestyle that included drinking, the company of women, and writing poetry. In 1702, he refused to take the vows of a Buddhist monk. The regent, under pressure from Kangxi and Lhazang Khan of the Khoshut, resigned in 1703.

==== Lhazang Khan ====
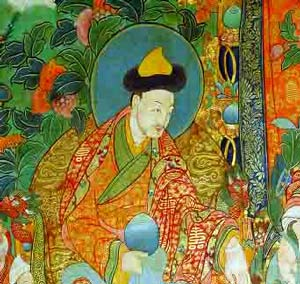
Lhazang Khan

Lhazang Khan of the Khoshut rose to power under uncertain circumstances. Differing accounts ascribe his rise to the poisoning of his elder brother and killing the Tibetan regent or that his position was requested by the Dalai Lama because the elder brother was sickly while the regent was removed by the Dalai Lama himself. Lhazang Khan and the regent engaged in a power struggle that resulted in the khan's victory. In 1705–1706, Lhazang entered Lhasa, killed the regent, and deposed the 6th Dalai Lama using his hedonous lifestyle as an excuse. Lhazang sought the support of the Kangxi Emperor of the Qing dynasty, who requested that he send the 6th Dalai Lama to Beijing. However the Dalai Lama fell ill soon after leaving Lhasa and died on the way in Amdo on 14 November 1706.

Lhazang presented a monk from Chagpori as the true reincarnation of the 5th Dalai Lama. In 1707, this monk was installed by the 5th Panchen Lama as Ngawang Yeshe Gyatso. This was not accepted by most of the Gelug school and it also annoyed the Khoshut chiefs. On 10 April 1710, the Kangxi Emperor recognized the new Dalai Lama by granting him a title and seal. In Lithang in eastern Tibet, local lamas identified a child as the reincarnation of the 6th Dalai Lama. In 1712, the youngest son of Güshi Khan, Trashi Batur Taiji, and the third son of Boshugtu Jinong, Cagan Danjin, declared their support for the boy. Lhazang's efforts to invalidate the Lithang reincarnation failed. The Khoshut chiefs asked the Kangxi Emperor to officially recognize the boy but the emperor left the matter undecided. Kangxi ordered the boy and his father to be interned in Kumbum Monastery in Kokonor in 1715.

Three Gelug abbots in Lhasa invited the Dzungars to help them. In 1717, the Dzungar prince Tseren Dondup invaded the Khoshut Khanate, deposed Yeshe Gyatso, installed the boy from Lithang as the 7th Dalai Lama, killed Lhazang Khan, and looted Lhasa. The Dzungars did not bring the boy to Lhasa and terrorized the populace, losing them the support of the Gelugpa. A Qing invasion in 1718 was annihilated by the Dzungars in the Battle of the Salween River, not far from Lhasa. A second and larger expedition of joint Qing and Tibetan forces (led by Polhané Sönam Topgyé the governor of Western Tibet) expelled the Dzungars from Tibet in 1720. They brought the boy with them from Kumbum to Lhasa and installed him as the 7th Dalai Lama in 1721.

=== Qing forces arrive in Tibet ===
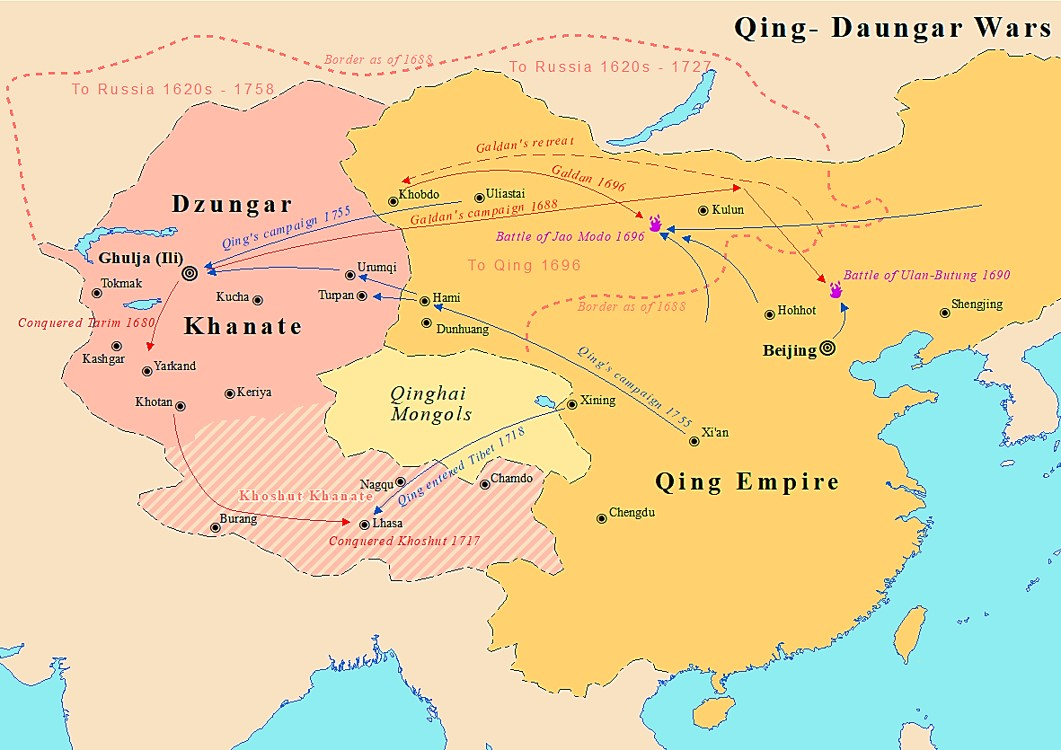
Map showing wars between Qing Dynasty and Dzungar Khanate

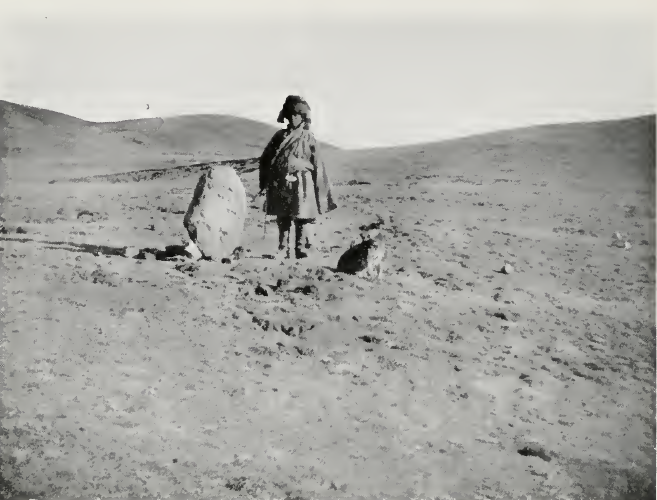
Boundary pillar between Tibet and China at Bum La (Ningching Shan), west of Batang (Teichman, 1922)

At that time, a Qing protectorate in Tibet (described by Stein as "sufficiently mild and flexible to be accepted by the Tibetan government") was initiated with a garrison at Lhasa. The area of Kham east of the Dri River (Jinsha River—Upper Yangtze) was annexed to Sichuan in 1726-1727 through a treaty. In 1721, the Qing expanded their protectorate in Lhasa with a council (the Kashag) of three Tibetan ministers, headed by Kangchennas. A Khalkha prince was made amban, the official representative of Qing in Tibet. Another Khalkha directed the military. The Dalai Lama's role at this time may have been purely symbolic in China's eyes, but it wasn't to the Dalai Lama nor to the Ganden Phodrang government or the Tibetan people, who viewed the Qing as a "patron". The Dalai Lama was also still highly influential because of the Mongols' religious beliefs.

The Qing came as patrons of the Khoshut, liberators of Tibet from the Dzungar, and supporters of the Dalai Lama Kelzang Gyatso, but when they tried to replace the Khoshut as rulers of Kokonor and Tibet, they earned the resentment of the Khoshut and also the Tibetans of Kokonor. Lobsang Danjin, a grandson of Güshi Khan, led a rebellion in 1723, when 200,000 Tibetans and Mongols attacked Xining. The Qing called in troops from Sichuan and suppressed the rebellion in less than a year. Polhané blocked the rebels' retreat from Qing retaliation. The rebellion was brutally suppressed.

Green Standard Army troops were garrisoned at multiple places such as Lhasa, Batang, Dartsendo, Lhari, Chamdo, and Litang, throughout the Dzungar war. Green Standard troops and Manchu Bannermen were both part of the Qing force that fought in Tibet in the war against the Dzungars. The Sichuan commander Yue Zhongqi (a descendant of Yue Fei) entered Lhasa first when the 2,000 Green Standard soldiers and 1,000 Manchu soldiers of the "Sichuan route" seized Lhasa. According to Mark C. Elliott, after 1728 the Qing used Green Standard troops to man the garrison in Lhasa rather than Bannermen. According to Evelyn S. Rawski, both Green Standard Army and Bannermen made up the Qing garrison in Tibet. According to Sabine Dabringhaus, Green Standard Chinese soldiers numbering more than 1,300 were stationed by the Qing in Tibet to support the 3,000-strong Tibetan army.

=== 1725-1761 ===
The Kangxi Emperor was succeeded by the Yongzheng Emperor in 1722. In 1725, amidst a series of Qing transitions reducing Qing forces in Tibet and consolidating control of Amdo and Kham, Kangchennas received the title of Prime Minister. The Emperor ordered the conversion of all Nyingma to Gelug. This persecution created a rift between Polhanas, who had been a Nyingma monk, and Kangchennas. Both of these officials, who represented Qing interests, were opposed by the Lhasa nobility, who had been allied with the Dzungars and were anti-Qing. They killed Kangchennas and took control of Lhasa in 1727, and Polhanas fled to his native Ngari. Polhanas gathered an army and retook Lhasa in July 1728 against opposition from the Lhasa nobility and their allies.

Qing troops arrived in Lhasa in September, and punished the anti-Qing faction by executing entire families, including women and children. The Dalai Lama was sent to Lithang Monastery in Kham. The Panchen Lama was brought to Lhasa and was given temporal authority over central Tsang and western Ngari Prefecture, creating a territorial division between the two high lamas that was to become a long-lasting feature of Chinese policy toward Tibet. Two ambans were established in Lhasa, with increased numbers of Qing troops. Over the 1730s, Qing troops were again reduced, and Polhanas gained more power and authority. The Dalai Lama returned to Lhasa in 1735, but temporal power remained with Polhanas. The Qing found Polhanas to be a loyal agent and an effective ruler over a stable Tibet, so he remained dominant until his death in 1747.

The Qing made the region of Amdo into the province of Qinghai in 1724, and a treaty of 1727 led to the incorporation of eastern Kham into neighbouring Chinese provinces in 1728. The Qing government sent a resident commissioner (amban) to Lhasa. A stone monument regarding the boundary between Tibet and neighbouring Chinese provinces, agreed upon by Lhasa and Beijing in 1726, was placed atop a mountain, and survived into at least the 19th century. This boundary, which was used until 1865, delineated the Dri River in Kham as the frontier between Tibet and Qing China. Territory east of the boundary was governed by Tibetan chiefs who were answerable to China.

The Qing Empire, at the time when the Qing began to rule these areas.

Polhanas' son Gyurme Namgyal took over upon his father's death in 1747. The ambans became convinced that he was going to lead a rebellion, so they assassinated him independently from Beijing's authority. News of the murders leaked out and an uprising broke out in the city during which the residents of Lhasa avenged the regent's death by killing both ambans.

The Dalai Lama stepped in and restored order in Lhasa, while it was thought that further uprisings would result in harsh retaliation from China. The Qianlong Emperor (Yongzheng's successor) sent a force of 800, which executed Gyurme Namgyal's family and seven members of the group that allegedly killed the ambans.

Temporal power was reasserted by the Dalai Lama in 1750. But the Qing Emperor re-organized the Tibetan government again with the 13-Article Ordinance for the More Effective Governing of Tibet and appointed new ambans. The powers of the Qing ambans in Lhasa were greatly increased. The ambans by this time had a broad right of supervision on the actions of the government, although the Qianlong Emperor was later disappointed with their performance and decided to further enhance their status. The number of soldiers in Tibet was kept at about 2,000. The defensive duties were partly helped out by a local force which was reorganized by the amban, and the Tibetan government continued to manage day-to-day affairs as before. The Emperor reorganized the Kashag to have four Kalöns in it. He also used Tibetan Buddhist iconography to try and bolster support among Tibetans, whereby six thangkas portrayed the Qing Emperor as Manjuśrī and Tibetan records of the time referred to him by that name.

The 7th Dalai Lama died in 1757. Afterwards, an assembly of lamas decided to institute the office of regent, to be held by an incarnate lama "until the new Dalai Lama attained his majority and could assume his official duties". The Seventh Demo, Ngawang Jampel Delek Gyatso, was selected unanimously. The 8th Dalai Lama, Jamphel Gyatso, was born in 1758 in Tsang. The Panchen Lama helped in the identification process, while Jampal Gyatso was recognized in 1761, then brought to Lhasa for his enthronement, presided over by the Panchen Lama, in 1762.

=== 1779-1793 ===
In 1779, the 6th Panchen Lama, fluent also in Hindi and Persian and well disposed to both Catholic missionaries in Tibet and East India Company agents in India, was invited to Peking for the celebration of the Emperor's 70th birthday. The "priest and patron" relationship between Tibet and Qing China was underscored by Emperor prostrating "to his spiritual father". In the final stages of his visit, after instructing the Emperor, the Panchen Lama contracted smallpox and died in 1780 in Beijing.

The following year, the 8th Dalai Lama assumed political power in Tibet. Problematic relations with Nepal led in 1788 to Gorkha Kingdom invasions of Tibet, sent by Bahadur Shah, the Regent of Nepal. Again in 1791, Shigatse was occupied by the Gorkas as was the great Tashilhunpo Monastery, the seat of the Panchen Lamas which was sacked and destroyed.

During the first incursion, the Qing Manchu amban in Lhasa spirited away to safety both the Dalai Lama and the Panchen Lama, but otherwise made no attempt to defend the country, though urgent dispatches to Beijing warned that alien powers had designs on the region, and threatened Qing Manchu interests. At that time, the Qing army found that the Nepalese forces had melted away, and no fighting was necessary. After the second Gorka incursion in 1791, another force of Manchus and Mongols joined by a strong contingents of Tibetan soldiers (10,000 of 13,000) supplied by local chieftains, repelled the invasion and pursued the Gorkhas to the Kathmandu Valley. Nepal conceded defeat and returned all the treasure they had plundered.

The Qianlong emperor was disappointed with the results of his 1751 decree and the performance of the ambans. Another decree followed, contained in the 29-Article Ordinance for the More Effective Governing of Tibet of 1793. It was designed to enhance the ambans' status, and ordered them to control border inspections, and serve as conduits through which the Dalai Lama and his cabinet were to communicate. Imperial China seized more power from the Tibetan authorities with each intervention on behalf of the Dalai Lama, and with this decree China created a much stricter form of indirect rule in Lhasa.

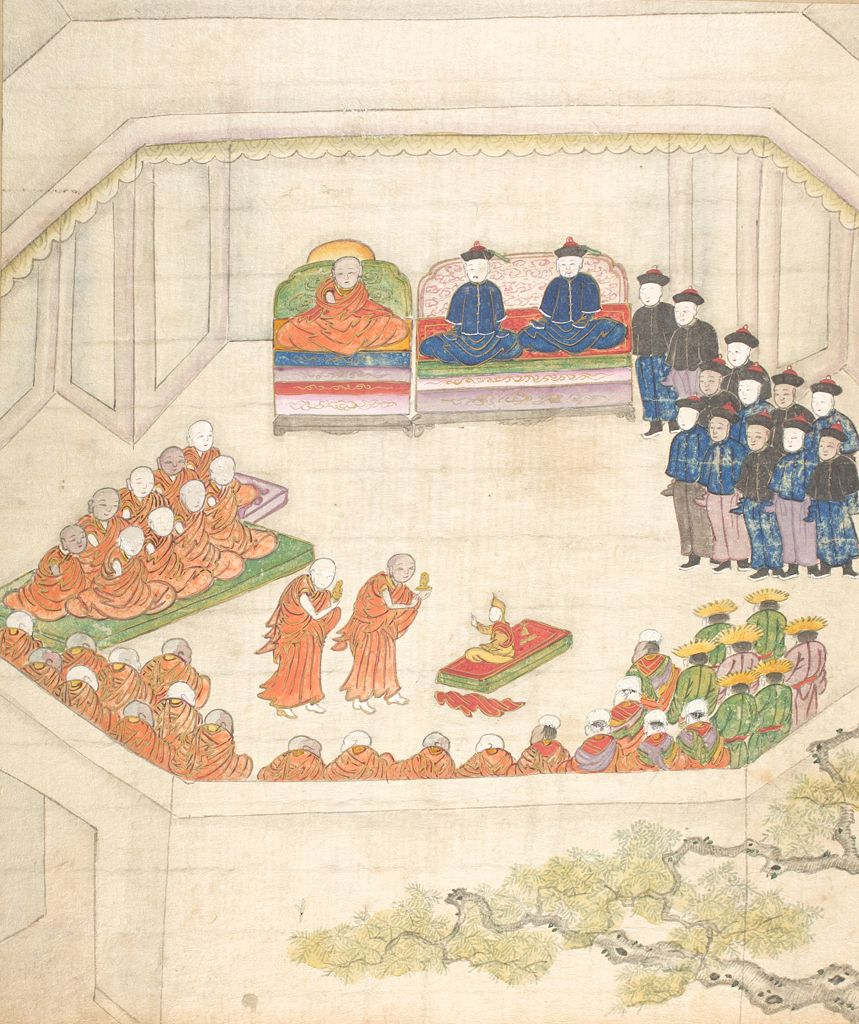
Lungtok Gyatso, 9th Dalai Lama, with lamas and monks, and ambans inattendance, around 1808.

The 29-article decree instituted the Golden Urn system which contradicted the traditional Tibetan method of locating and recognizing incarnate lamas. The same decree also elevated ambans above the Kashag and above the regents in regards to Tibetan political affairs. The decree prohibited the Dalai Lama and Panchen Lama from petitioning the Chinese Emperor directly whereas petitions were decreed to pass through the ambans. The ambans were to take control of Tibetan frontier defense and foreign affairs. Tibetan authorities' foreign correspondence, even with the Mongols of Kokonor (present-day Qinghai), were to be approved by the ambans, whom were decreed as commanders of the Qing garrison, and the Tibetan army whose strength was set at 3000 men. Trade was also decreed as restricted and travel documents were to be issued by the ambans. The ambans were to review all judicial decisions. The Tibetan currency, which had been the source of trouble with Nepal, was to be taken under Beijing's supervision.

The 29-article decree also controlled the traditional methods used to recognize and enthrone both the incarnate Dalai Lama and Panchen Lama, by means of a lottery administered by the ambans in Lhasa. The Emperor wanted to control the recognition process of incarnate lamas because the Gelug school of the Dalai Lamas was the official religion of his Qing court. Another purpose was to have the Mongol grand-lama Qubilγan found in Tibet rather than from the descendants of Genghis Khan. With the decreed lottery system, the names of candidates were written on folded slips of paper which were placed in a golden urn (Mongol altan bumba; Tibetan gser bum:Chinese jīnpíng:金瓶). According to Warren Smith, the 29-article decree's directives were either never fully implemented, or quickly discarded, as the Qing were more interested in a symbolic gesture of authority than actual sovereignty; the relationship between Qing and Tibet was one between states, or between an empire and a semi-autonomous state. However, Elliot Sperling states that the subordination place of Tibet within the Qing Empire by this time was beyond dispute. Despite this attempt to further control Tibet's secular and spiritual ruling classes, the Emperor's urn was not always used or politely ignored in such cases. The Tibetans left some question regarding the urn's usage to highlight Tibetan autonomy when the Qing powers were strong, but Qing emperors had the final say in recognizing new incarnations through the system of the Golden Urn. At times, the selection was approved after the fact by the Emperor. The Emperor's urn was formally used at other times, and there was suggestion that the Tibetans were more willing to employ the urn to maintain a semblance of Qing's protection when the imperial power was weaker. The 11th Dalai Lama was selected by the Golden Urn method. While the 12th Dalai Lama was recognized by traditional Tibetan methods, he was confirmed by the urn. There was an open pretense that the urn was used for the 10th Dalai Lama, when it was actually not used.

=== 19th century ===
The Qing government was alarmed by the British defeat of Nepal in the Anglo-Nepalese War and the re-establishment of a British resident in Nepal's capital Kathmandu because the Nepalese, in an effort to obtain aids from Qing China, gave false information to the Qing government, claiming that the British demanded free passage through Nepalese territory to Tibet and that they were ordering Nepal to transfer her tribute from China to the Indian government (then under the British East India Company). In order to learn more about what had occurred, Qing China dispatched an imperial high commissioner to Tibet in charge of a small military force. When the Qing imperial commissioner discovered the truth, he declined to aid Nepal and instead restricted himself to expressing his desire that the Indian government could decide it was time to withdraw its resident from Kathmandu. The Qing imperial commissioner let the matter go and left for China proper in 1817 after the British said they would do so if China sent a resident to Nepal to stop Anglo-Nepalese tensions.

In 1837, a minor Kham chieftain Gompo Namgyal, of Nyarong, began expanding his control regionally and launched offensives against the Hor States, Chiefdom of Lithang, Kingdom of Derge, the Kingdom of Chakla and Chiefdom of Bathang, which were considered Tusi under the umbrella of the Qing Empire. Qing China sent troops in against Namgyal in 1849 but the campaign was unsuccessful. They tried to negotiate and additional troops were not dispatched. Qing military posts were present along the historic trading route between Beijing and Lhasa, but "did not have any authority over the native chiefs". By 1862, Namgyal blocked trade routes from China to Lhasa, and sent troops to Chamdo and Drayab. The Kingdom of Derge and another had appealed to both the Lhasa and the Qing imperial governments for help against Namgyal. During the Nyarong War, the Tibetan authorities sent an army in 1863, and defeated Namgyal then killed him at his Nyarong fort by 1865. Afterward, Lhasa asserted its authority over parts of northern Kham and established the Office of the Tibetan High Commissioner to govern. Lhasa reclaimed Nyarong, Degé and the Hor States north of Nyarong. China recalled the imperial forces.

Nepal was a tributary state to China from 1788 to 1908. In the Treaty of Thapathali signed in 1856 that concluded the Nepalese-Tibetan War, Tibet and Nepal agreed to "regard the Chinese Emperor as heretofore with respect." Michael van Walt van Praag, legal advisor to the 14th Dalai Lama, claims that 1856 treaty provided for a Nepalese mission, namely Vakil, in Lhasa which later allowed Nepal to claim a diplomatic relationship with Tibet in its application for United Nations membership in 1949. However, the status of Nepalese mission as diplomatic is disputed and the Nepalese Vakils stayed in Tibet until the 1960s when Tibet had been annexed by the People's Republic of China for more than a decade.

In 1841, the Hindu Dogra dynasty attempted to establish their authority on Ü-Tsang but were defeated in the Sino-Sikh War (1841–1842).

In the mid-19th century, arriving with an amban, a community of Chinese troops from Sichuan that had married Tibetan women settled down in the Lubu neighborhood of Lhasa, where their descendants established a community and assimilated into Tibetan culture. Another community, Hebalin, was where Chinese Muslim troops and their wives and offspring lived.

In 1879, the 13th Dalai Lama was enthroned, but did not assume full temporal control until 1895, after the National Assembly of the Tibetan Government (tshongs 'du rgyas 'dzom) unanimously called for him to assume power. Before that time, the British Empire increased their interest in Tibet, and a number of Indians entered the region, first as explorers and then as traders. The British sent a mission with a military escort through Sikkim in 1885, whose entry was refused by Tibet and the British withdrew. Tibet then organized an army to be stationed at the border, led by Dapon Lhading (mda' dpon lha sding, d.u.) and Tsedron Sonam Gyeltsen (rtse mgron bsod nams rgyal mtshan, d.u.) with soldiers from southern Kongpo and those from Kham's Drakyab. At a pass between Sikkim and Tibet, which Tibet considered a part of Tibet, the British attacked in 1888.

Following the attack, the British and Chinese signed the 1890 Anglo-Chinese Convention Relating to Sikkim and Tibet, which Tibet disregarded as it did "all agreements signed between China and Britain regarding Tibet, taking the position that it was for Lhasa alone to negotiate with foreign powers on Tibet's behalf". Qing China and Britain had also concluded an earlier treaty in 1886, the "Convention Relating to Burmah and Thibet" as well as a later treaty in 1893. Regardless of those treaties, Tibet continued to bar British envoys from its territory.

Then in 1896, the Qing Governor of Sichuan attempted to gain control of the Nyarong valley in Kham during a military attack led by Zhou Wanshun. The Dalai Lama circumvented the amban and a secret mission led by Sherab Chonpel (shes rab chos 'phel, d.u.) was sent directly to Beijing with a demand for the withdrawal of Chinese forces. The Qing Guangxu Emperor agreed, and the "territory was returned to the direct rule of Lhasa".

=== Lhasa, 1900-1909 ===
At the beginning of the 20th century the British Empire and Russian Empires were competing for supremacy in Central Asia. During "the Great Game", a period of rivalry between Russia and Britain, the British desired a representative in Lhasa to monitor and offset Russian influence.

Years earlier, the Dalai Lama had developed an interest in Russia through his debating partner, Buriyat Lama Agvan Dorjiev. Then in 1901, Dorjiev had delivered letters from Tibet to the Tzar, namely a formal letter of appreciation from the Dalai Lama, and another from the Kashak directly soliciting support against the British. Dorjiev's journey to Russia was seen as a threat by British interests in India, despite Russian statements they would not intervene. After realizing the Qing lacked any real authority in Tibet, a British expedition was dispatched in 1904, officially to resolve border disputes between Tibet and Sikkim. The expedition quickly turned into an invasion which captured Lhasa.

For the first time and in response to the invasion, the Chinese foreign ministry asserted that China was sovereign over Tibet, the first clear statement of such a claim.

Before the British invasion force arrived in Lhasa, the 13th Dalai Lama escaped to seek alliances for Tibet. The Dalai Lama travelled first to Mongolia and requested help from Russia against China and Britain, and learned in 1907 that Britain and Russia signed a non-interference in Tibet agreement. This essentially removed Tibet from the so-called "Great Game". The Dalai Lama received a dispatch from Lhasa, and was about to return there from Amdo in the summer of 1908 when he decided to go Beijing instead, where he was received with a ceremony appropriately "accorded to any independent sovereign", as witnessed by U.S. Ambassador to China William Rockwell. Tibetan affairs were discussed directly with Qing Dowager Empress Cixi, then together with the young Emperor. Cixi died in November 1908 during the state visit, and the Dalai Lama performed the funeral rituals. The Dalai Lama also made contacts with Japanese diplomats and military advisors.

The Dalai Lama returned from his search for support against China and Britain to Lhasa in 1909, and initiated reforms to establish a standing Tibetan army while consulting with Japanese advisors. Treaties were signed between the British and the Tibetans, then between China and Britain. The 1904 document was known as the Convention Between Great Britain and Tibet. The main points of the treaty allowed the British to trade in Yadong, Gyantse, and Gartok while Tibet was to pay a large indemnity of 7,500,000 rupees, later reduced by two-thirds, with the Chumbi Valley ceded to Britain until the imdenity was received. Further provisions recognised the Sikkim-Tibet border and prevented Tibet from entering into relations with other foreign powers. As a result, British economic influence expanded further in Tibet, while at the same time Tibet remained under the first claim in 1904 of "sovereignty" by the Qing dynasty of China.

The Anglo-Tibetan treaty was followed by a 1906 Convention Between Great Britain and China Respecting Tibet, by which the "Government of Great Britain engages not to annex Tibetan territory or to interfere in the administration of Tibet. The Government of China also undertakes not to permit any other foreign State to interfere with the territory or internal administration of Tibet." Moreover, Beijing agreed to pay London 2.5 million rupees which Lhasa was forced to agree upon in the Anglo-Tibetan treaty of 1904.

As the Dalai Lama had learned during his travels for support, in 1907 Britain and Russia agreed that in "conformity with the admitted principle of the 1904 suzerainty of China over Tibet", (from 1904), both nations "engage not to enter into negotiations with Tibet except through the intermediary of the Chinese Government."

=== Qing in Kham, 1904-1911 ===
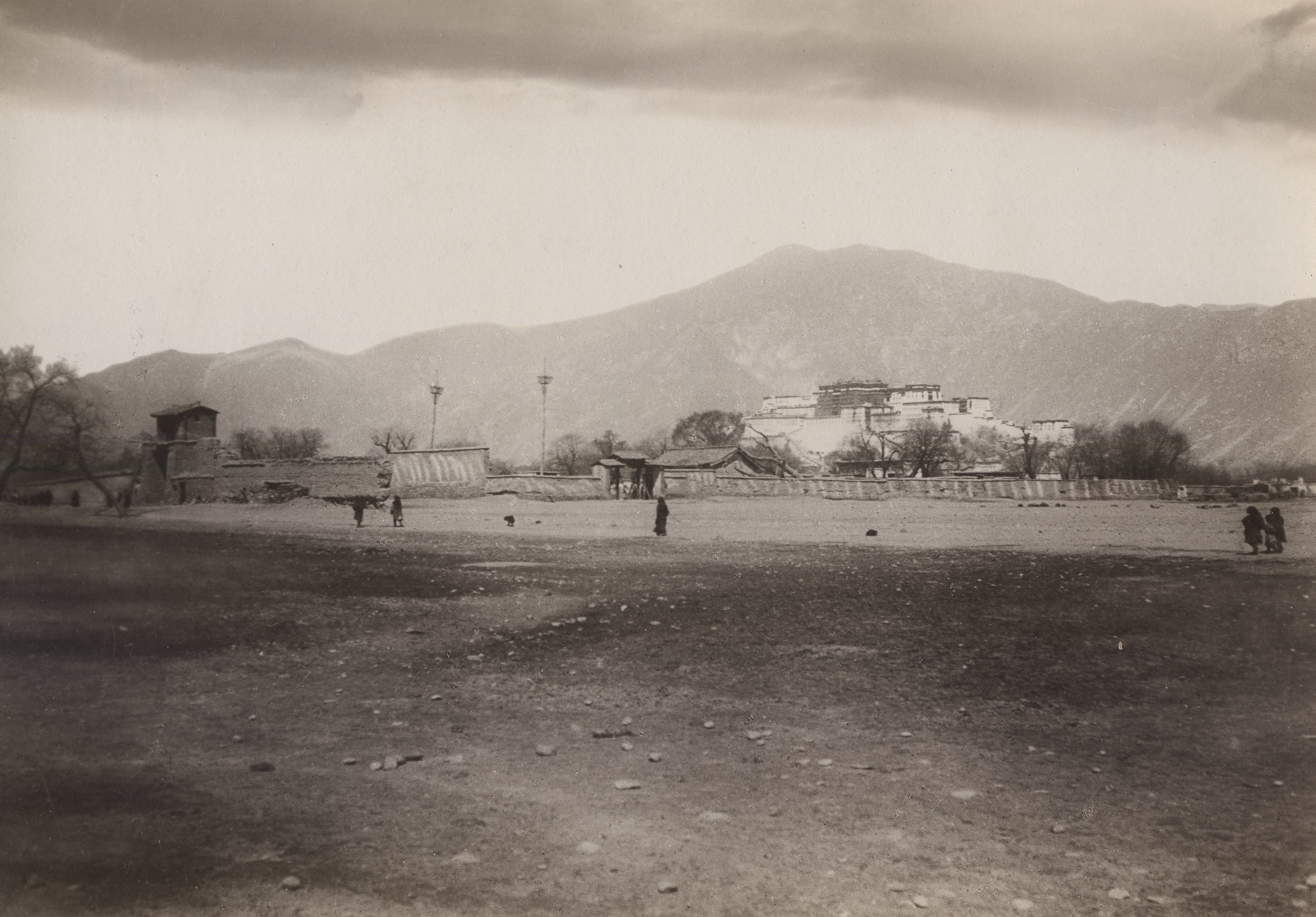
Lhasa Amban's yamen from Southeast around 1900–1901.

Soon after the British invasion of Tibet, the Qing rulers in China were alarmed. They sent the imperial official Feng Quan (凤全) to Kham to begin reasserting Qing control. Feng Quan's initiatives in Kham of land reforms and reductions to the number of monks led to an uprising by monks at a Batang monastery in the Chiefdom of Batang. Tibetan control of the Batang region of Kham in eastern Tibet appears to have continued uncontested following a 1726-1727 treaty. In Batang's uprising, Feng Quan was killed, as were Chinese farmers and their fields were burned. The British invasion through Sikkim triggered a Khampa reaction, where chieftains attacked and French missionaries, Manchu and Han Qing officials, and Christian converts were killed. French Catholic missionaries Père Pierre-Marie Bourdonnec and Père Jules Dubernard were killed around the Mekong.

In response, Beijing appointed army commander Zhao Erfeng, the Governor of Xining, to "reintegrate" Kham into China. Known of as "the Butcher of Kham" Zhao was sent in either 1905 or 1908 on a punitive expedition. His troops executed monks destroyed a number of monasteries in Kham and Amdo, and an early form of "sinicization" of the region began. Later, around the time of the collapse of the Qing Dynasty, Zhao's soldiers mutinied and beheaded him.

=== Program of integration of Tibet to the rest of China (1905–1911) ===
From 1905, China temporarily took back the control of Tibet as suzerain power, until the 1911 Revolution which marked the collapse of the Qing Empire and the installation of the Republic of China. After obtaining the departure of the British troops in return for an indemnity payment, the Qing dynasty, although weakened, decided to play a more active role in the conduct of Tibetan affairs. To preserve its interests, it implemented, from 1905 to 1911, a program of integration of Tibet to the rest of China at the political, economic and cultural levels.

Plans were laid to build a railway line connecting Sichuan to Tibet, to form an army of six thousand men and to secularise the Tibetan government by creating non-ecclesiastical governmental commissions. A mint was to be established, roads and telephone lines were to be built and local resources were to be exploited. In Lhasa, a Chinese school opened in 1907 and a military college in 1908.

A Chinese postal service with five post offices was established in central Tibet and the first stamps were issued (with inscriptions in Chinese and Tibetan).

In 1909, a bilingual newspaper, the Vernacular newspaper of Tibet, the first of its kind, was printed in Lhasa on presses imported from Calcutta. It appeared every ten days and each issue was printed in 300 or 400 copies. Its objective, at the same time educational and of propaganda, was to facilitate the administrative reforms engaged by Lian Yu and Zhang Yintang.

This program was however reduced to nothing by the outbreak of the 1911 Revolution, the collapse of the Qing empire and the elimination of Chao Ehr-feng.

For Hsaio-ting Lin, the series of reforms initiated by Chao Ehr-feng can be seen as the first attempt at state-building by modern China in its southwestern marches.

Before the collapse of the Qing Empire, the Swedish explorer Sven Hedin returned in 1909 from a three-year-long expedition to Tibet, having mapped and described a large part of inner Tibet. During his travels, he visited the 9th Panchen Lama. For some of the time, Hedin had to camouflage himself as a Tibetan shepherd (because he was European). In an interview following a meeting with the Russian czar he described the situation in 1909 as follows:

"Currently, Tibet is in the cramp-like hands of China's government. The Chinese realize that if they leave Tibet for the Europeans, it will end its isolation in the East. That is why the Chinese prevent those who wish to enter Tibet. The Dalai Lama is currently also in the hands of the Chinese Government"... "Mongols are fanatics. They adore the Dalai Lama and obey him blindly. If he tomorrow orders them go to war against the Chinese, if he urges them to a bloody revolution, they will all like one man follow him as their ruler. China's government, which fears the Mongols, hooks on to the Dalai Lama."... "There is calm in Tibet. No ferment of any kind is perceptible" (translated from Swedish).

=== Qing collapse and Tibet independence ===
In February 1910, the Qing General Zhong Ying sent another army to Tibet during its attempt to establish direct rule. After the Dalai Lama was told he was to be "arrested", he escaped from Lhasa to India and remained for three months. Reports arrived of Lhasa's sacking, and the arrests of government officials. He was later informed by letter that Qing China had "deposed" him.

After the Dalai Lama's return to Tibet at a location outside of Lhasa, the collapse of the Qing dynasty began due to the Wuchang Uprising in October 1911. After the Xinhai Lhasa turmoil the Qing amban submitted a formal letter of surrender to the Dalai Lama in the summer of 1912.

On 13 February 1913, the Dalai Lama declared Tibet an independent state, and announced that what he described as the historic "priest and patron relationship" with China had ended. The amban and China's military were expelled, and all Chinese residents in Tibet were given a required departure limit of three years. All remaining Qing forces left Tibet by 1913.

== See also ==
- Tibet under Yuan rule
- Ming–Tibet relations
- Qing dynasty in Inner Asia
- Manchuria under Qing rule
- Mongolia under Qing rule
- Xinjiang under Qing rule
- Taiwan under Qing rule
- Dzungar–Qing War
- List of rulers of Tibet
- History of Tibet

== Bibliography ==
- Atwood, Christopher P. (2004), Encyclopedia of Mongolia and the Mongol Empire, Facts on File
- Tibet, Proving Truth from Facts, Department of Information and International Relations, Central Tibetan Administration, 1994
  - Tibet: Proving Truth from Facts, Central Tibetan Administration, 1 January 1996.
- Dabringhaus, Sabine (2014), "The Ambans of Tibet—Imperial Rule at the Inner Asian Periphery", in Dabringhaus, Sabine; Duindam, Jeroen (eds.), The Dynastic Centre and the Provinces, Agents and Interactions, Brill, pp. 114–126, doi:10.1163/9789004272095_008, ISBN 9789004272095, JSTOR 10.1163/j.ctt1w8h2x3.12
- Dai, Yingcong (2009), The Sichuan Frontier and Tibet: Imperial Strategy in the Early Qing, University of Washington Press, ISBN 978-0-295-98952-5
- Elliott, Mark C. (2001), The Manchu Way: The Eight Banners and Ethnic Identity in Late Imperial China, Stanford University Press, ISBN 978-0-8047-4684-7
- Fairbank, John (2008), The Cambridge History of China, Volume 10, Late Ch'ing 1800-1911, Part 1, Cambridge University Press
- Garri, Irina (2020), "The rise of the Five Hor States of Northern Kham. Religion and politics in the Sino-Tibetan borderlands", Études mongoles et sibériennes, centrasiatiques et tibétaines, 51 (51), doi:10.4000/emscat.4631, S2CID 230547448
- Gernet, Jaques (1972), A History of Chinese Civilization, Cambridge University Press
- Goldstein, Melvyn C. (1989), A History of Modern Tibet, 1913-1951: The Demise of the Lamaist State, University of California Press, ISBN 978-0-520-06140-8
  - Goldstein, Melvyn C. (1991), A History of Modern Tibet, 1913-1951: The Demise of the Lamaist State, University of California Press, ISBN 9780520911765
- Goldstein, Melvyn C. (April 1995), Tibet, China and the United States (PDF), The Atlantic Council – via Case Western Reserve University
- Goldstein, Melvyn C. (1997), The Snow Lion and the Dragon: China, Tibet, and the Dalai Lama, University of California Press, ISBN 978-0-520-21951-9
- Gros, Stephane (2019), Chronology of Major Events: With Particular Attention to the Sino-Tibetan Borderlands, Amsterdam University Press
- Grousset, René (1970), The Empire of the Steppes, Rutgers University Press
- Grunfeld, A. Tom (30 July 1996), The Making of Modern Tibet, M.E. Sharpe, ISBN 978-0-7656-3455-9
- Hevia, James L. (1995), Cherishing Men from Afar: Qing Guest Ritual and the Macartney Embassy of 1793, Duke University Press, ISBN 9780822316374
- The Question of Tibet and the Rule of Law (PDF), Geneva: International Commission of Jurists, 1959
- Lamb, Alastair (1989), Tibet, China & India, 1914-1950: A history of imperial diplomacy, Roxford Books, ISBN 9780907129035
- Mehra, Parshotam (1974), The McMahon Line and After: A Study of the Triangular Contest on India's North-eastern Frontier Between Britain, China and Tibet, 1904-47, Macmillan, ISBN 9780333157374 – via archive.org
- Mote, Frederick W. (2003), Imperial China: 900 - 1800, Cambridge, Mass.: Harvard Univ. Press, ISBN 9780674012127, OCLC 54436613
- Mullin, Glenn H. (2001), The Fourteen Dalai Lamas: A Sacred Legacy of Reincarnation, Clear Light Pub, ISBN 978-1-57416-039-0
- Norbu, Dawa (2001), China's Tibet Policy, Routledge, ISBN 978-1-136-79793-4
- Petech, Luciano (2013), "23. The Administration of Tibet During the First Half-Century of Chinese Protectorate", The Tibetan History Reader, Columbia University Press
- Shakabpa, Tsepon Wangchuk Deden (2010), One Hundred Thousand Moons: An Advanced Political History of Tibet, translated by Maher, Derek F., BRILL, ISBN 978-90-04-17732-1
- Schoppa, R. Keith (2020), Revolution and Its Past: Identities and Change in Modern Chinese History, Routledge
- Schwieger, Peter (2015), The Dalai Lama and the Emperor of China, Columbia University Press
- Smith, Warren (1996), Tibetan Nation: A History of Tibetan Nationalism And Sino-Tibetan Relations, Avalon Publishing, ISBN 978-0-8133-3155-3
- Spence, Heather (1993). British policy and the 'development' of Tibet 1912-1933 (Doctor of Philosophy). Department of History and Politics, Faculty of Arts, University of Wollongong.
- Spencer, Haines R. (2018), "Charismatic Authority in Context: An Explanation of Guushi Khan's Swift Rise to Power in the Early 17th Century", Mongolica: An International Journal of Mongolian Studies
- Sperling, Elliot (2004), The Tibet-China Conflict: History and Polemics (PDF), East-West Center Washington, ISBN 978-1-932728-12-5, archived from the original (PDF) on 2019-02-03
- Sperling, Elliott (2009), Tibet and China: The Interpretation of History Since 1950
- Stein, R.A. (1972), "Tibetan Civilization", The Geographical Journal, 138 (4), Faber and Faber LTD: 501, Bibcode:1972GeogJ.138..501W, doi:10.2307/1795516, JSTOR 1795516
- Taveirne, Patrick (2004), Han-Mongol Encounters and Missionary Endeavors: A History of Scheut in Ordos (Hetao) 1874-1911, Leuven University Press, ISBN 978-90-5867-365-7
- Teltscher, Kate (2013), The High Road to China, Bloomsbury Publishing, ISBN 9781408846759
- Travers, Alice; Fitzherbert, Solomon George (2020), "Introduction: The Ganden Phodrang's Military Institutions and Culture between the 17th and the 20th Centu-ries, at a Crossroads of Influences", Revue d'Études Tibétaines, 53, CNRS: 7–28
- Wang, Xiuyu (28 November 2011), China's Last Imperial Frontier: Late Qing Expansion in Sichuan's Tibetan Borderlands, Lexington Books, ISBN 978-0-7391-6810-3
- Yeh, Emily T. (13 January 2009), "Living together in Lhasa: Ethnic relations, coercive amity, and subaltern cosmopolitanism", in Mayaram, Shail (ed.), The Other Global City, Routledge, ISBN 978-1-135-85150-7
- Yeh, Emily T. (25 October 2013), Taming Tibet: Landscape Transformation and the Gift of Chinese Development, Cornell University Press, ISBN 978-0-8014-6978-7
