= Priest and patron relationship =

Tibetan political theory

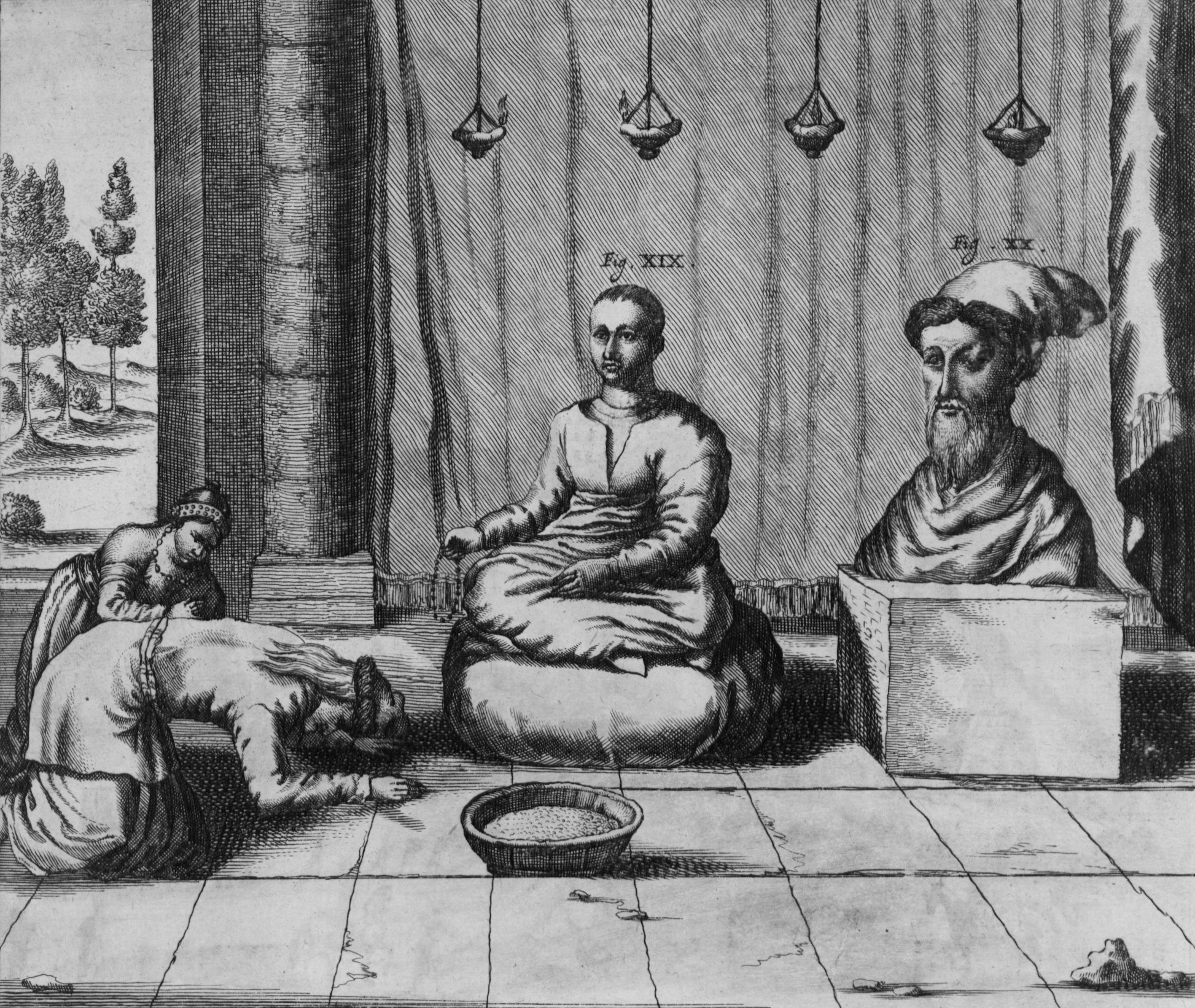
Statues of the Fifth Dalai Lama and (apparently) Güshi Khan seen by Johann Grueber in the lobby of the Dalai Lama's palace in 1661

The priest and patron relationship, also written as priest–patron or cho-yon (Tibetan: མཆོད་ཡོན་, Wylie: mchod yon; Chinese: 檀越關係; pinyin: Tányuè Guānxì), is the Tibetan political theory that the relationship between Tibet and China referred to a symbiotic link between a spiritual leader and a lay patron, such as the historic relationship between the Dalai Lama and the Qing emperor. They were respectively spiritual teacher and lay patron rather than subject and lord. Chöyön is an abbreviation of two Tibetan words: chöney, "that which is worthy of being given gifts and alms" (for example, a lama or a deity), and yöndag, "he who gives gifts to that which is worthy" (a patron).

During the 1913 Simla Conference, the 13th Dalai Lama's negotiators cited the priest and patron relationship to explain the lack of any clearly demarcated boundary between Tibet and the rest of China (i.e. as a religious benefactor, the Qing did not need to be hedged against). According to this concept, in the case of Yuan rule of Tibet in the 13th and 14th centuries, Tibetan Lamas provided religious instruction; performed rites, divination and astrology, and offered the khan religious titles like "protector of religion" or "religious king"; the khan (Kublai and his successors), in turn, protected and advanced the interests of the "priest" ("lama"). The lamas also made effective regents through whom the Mongols ruled Tibet. According to Sam van Schaik, the Mongols ruled Tibet not as an administrative province of the Yuan dynasty but as a Mongol colony. The Bureau of Buddhist and Tibetan Affairs and Imperial Preceptor in Dadu were at the top of the Tibetan administration, but due to the great distance from Tibet, they had little direct influence on daily governance. Hence, the highest authority in Tibet was the administrator of the Sakya who deferred to the abbot in religious matters.

Historians such as Melvyn Goldstein, Elliot Sperling, and Jaques Gernet have described Tibet during the Yuan and Qing dynasties as a protectorate, vassal state, tributary, or something similar. The political subordination of Tibet to the Yuan and Qing polities was apparent, however the de facto independent Tibetan government (1912–1951) and Tibetan exiles promote the status of independent nation with only a patron and priest relationship and the idea that the political subordination to the Yuan and Qing emperors was a misunderstanding. Some interpretations and assertions of historical record on the status of Tibet as an integral part of China or an independent state which purport to be of older origin were actually formulated since the 20th century. Elliot Sperling, an expert on the history of Tibet and Tibetan–Chinese relations at Indiana University, considers the Tibetan concept of a "priest–patron" religious relationship governing Sino-Tibetan relations to the exclusion of concrete political subordination to be a "rather recent construction" and unsubstantiated. Instead, the patron and priest relationship coexisted with Tibet's political subordination to the Yuan and Qing dynasties. He writes that the priest and patron relationship has been present in times of political subordination, such as during the Yuan and Qing dynasties, as well as in times which the patrons did not possess political authority in Tibet, such as during periods of the Ming and Qing.

== See also ==
- Mongol conquest of Tibet
- Tibet under Yuan rule
- Ming–Tibet relations
- Tibet under Qing rule
- Tibetan sovereignty debate

== Bibliography ==
- van Schaik, Sam (2011), Tibet: A History, Yale University Press
- Sperling, Elliot (2004), The Tibet-China Conflict: History and Polemics, East-West Center Washington, ISBN 978-1-932728-12-5

== Sources ==
- Cüppers, Christopher, ed. (2004). The Relationship Between Religion and State (chos srid zung 'brel) In Traditional Tibet: Proceedings of a Seminar Held in Lumbini, Nepal, March 2000. LIRI Seminar Proceeding Series. Vol. 1. Lumbini: Lumbini International Research Institute. ISBN 99933-769-9-X.
- Haines, R Spencer (2018). "Charismatic Authority in Context: An Explanation of Guushi Khan's Swift Rise to Power in the Early 17th Century". Mongolica: An International Journal of Mongolian Studies. 52. International Association of Mongolists: 24–31.
- Mehra, Parshotam (1974), The McMahon Line and After: A Study of the Triangular Contest on India's North-eastern Frontier Between Britain, China and Tibet, 1904-47, Macmillan, ISBN 9780333157374 – via archive.org
