= Second Battle of Simtokha Dzong =

Military confrontation between Bhutan and Tibet

Second Tibetan Invasion of Bhutan
- Part of the Unification of Bhutan and the Tsangpa-Ngawang Namgyal conflict
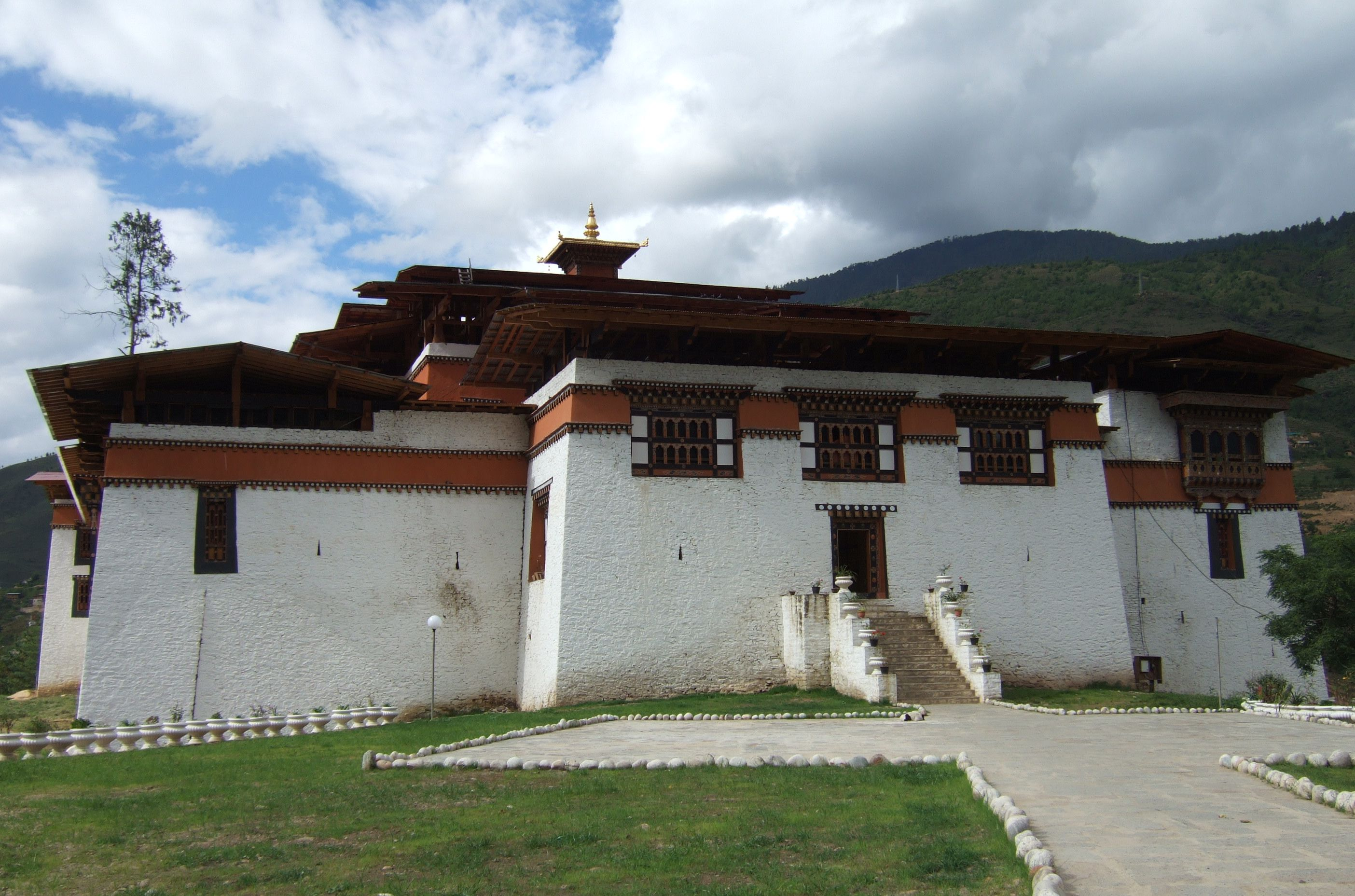
- The reconstructed Simtokha Dzong.
Date	1634
Location	Simtokha Dzong, modern-day Bhutan
Result	Tsangpa retreat, strategic victory of Ngawang Namgyal: Complete destruction of Simtokha Dzong; Barawa sect is driven from Bhutan
Territorial changes	Ngawang Namgyal's supporters capture the Gasa valley

Belligerents
Tsangpa dynasty; forces of the "Five Lamas" (Note: While there is a relative agreement among scholars that the Lhapa, Nenyingpa, and Chagzampa lamas were among Zhabdrung's enemies, it remains unclear which other sects might have fought against him or if there were even just five. Among the lamaist groups that have been considered possible members of the "Five Lamas" are: Gedan Shingtapa (Gelug), Barawa, Kathogpa and Sakyapa, although the latter two are often dismissed as they continued to flourish under Ngawang Namgyal's rule.)	forces of Zhabdrung Rinpoche Ngawang Namgyal

Commanders and leaders
Unknown Tibetan commander; Chokdrub Könchog Gyeltshen (Barawa sect lama); Several other lamas	Tenzin Drukgyal (military chief commander); Unknown Simtokha garrison commander

Strength
Five Tibetan divisions (Note: Four divisions were present during the battle at Simtokha Dzong, while the fifth occupied the Kingdom of Bumthang.); Unknown number of lamaist troops	Unknown, but probably small

Casualties and losses
Tsangpa: likely heavy "Five Lamas": Unknown	Unknown

The Second Tibetan Invasion of Bhutan or the Second Battle of Simtokha Dzong was a military confrontation in 1634 between the supporters of Zhabdrung Ngawang Namgyal and the forces of the Tibetan Tsangpa dynasty and several Bhutanese lamas allied against him. The latter initially conquered Zhabdrung's seat, Simtokha Dzong, threatening to eliminate his young dominion. The castle's ammunition stores were accidentally ignited during the battle, however, resulting in an explosion that destroyed Simtokha Dzong and much of the Tibetan army. Seizing this chance, Zhabdrung's followers rallied and ousted the Tibetans from their territory, turning the battle into a decisive strategic victory of Ngawang Namgyal, paving the way for the Unification of Bhutan under his rule.

== Prelude ==
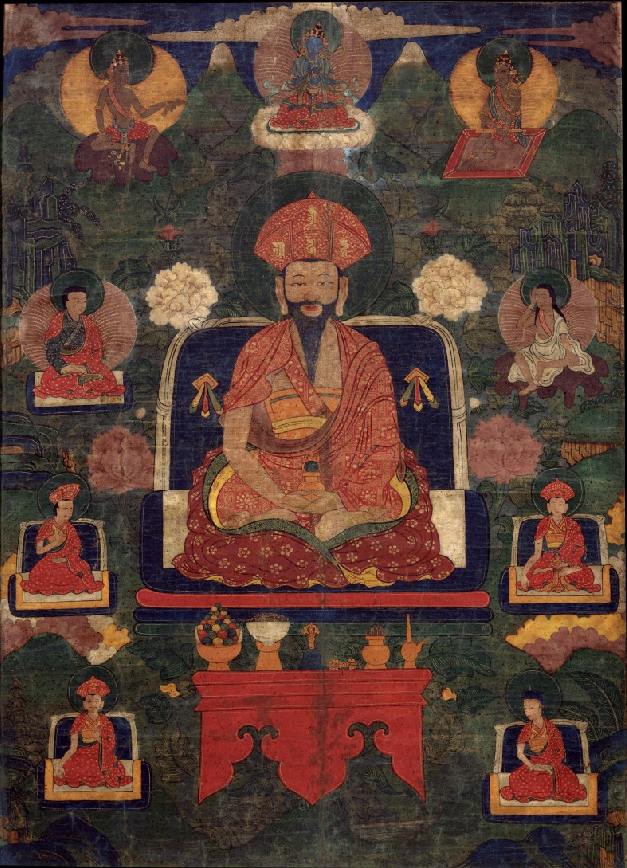
Zhabdrung Rinpoche Ngawang Namgyal, military leader and founder of Bhutan.

As result of a theological and political dispute in Tibet over the reincarnation of the Drukpa Lineage-holder in the early 17th century, there were two men who claimed to be the rightful 18th abbot of Ralung Monastery: Ngawang Namgyal and Gyalwang Pagsam Wangpo. Both were backed by different groups within the Drukpa sect, but the latter also enjoyed the support of the Tsangpa dynasty that dominated central Tibet at the time. The conflict eventually escalated, and Ngawang Namgyal, whose "high level of intelligence, charisma and ambition were perceived as significant threats to the establishment", chose to go into voluntary exile in 1616/17. Invited by the lama of Gasa, he and his retinue settled down in the region that would later become western Bhutan. This area was at the time divided among several different chiefdoms, petty kingdoms and Buddhist sects that constantly fought for supremacy. Ngawang Namgyal was well received by the local Drukpa Kagyu clergy and began to garner support among the local populace while continuing to openly defy his rivals in Tibet, including the Tsangpa dynasty. As his fame and popularity grew, "he acquired the sobriquet ‘Zhabdrung Rinpoche’, literally ‘the precious jewel at whose feet one submits’."

His growing influence angered not only his Tibetan enemies, but also several powerful rival Buddhist schools of western Bhutan such as the Lhapa sect. Eventually, the Tsangpa invaded Bhutan in collaboration with the Lhapa hierarchs to eliminate Ngawang Namgyal in 1619. This first invasion was eventually defeated by the Bhutanese chieftains who had rallied to Zhabdrung's support, but the conflict between him and the Tsangpa continued, especially since a smallpox epidemic that killed King Karma Phuntsok Namgyal and many other members of the Tibetan dynasty was attributed to Ngawang Namgyal's alleged magical powers.

After a time of self-chosen seclusion, Zhabdrung proclaimed his intention to become the spiritual and temporal ruler of Bhutan. While the Drukpa Kagyu, Sakya, and Nyingma schools as well as many chieftains accepted his political domination, several other lamas did not and continued to resist him. As he consolidated his control over the western valleys, Zhabdrung began to construct a strategically placed dzong as his seat of power in 1629. It was during the construction that five lamaist factions attacked his party and his supporters. The following First Battle of Simtokha Dzong resulted in a decisive victory of Ngawang Namgyal's forces, while the dzong was finished in 1631. As their own efforts to remove Zhabdrung failed, the lamas appealed for the new Tsangpa ruler, Karma Tenkyong, to launch another invasion of Bhutan to overthrow their rival. For some years, however, negotiations between the Tibetans and Ngawang Namgyal's followers took place to avoid war. These proved unfruitful, and as result the Tsangpa launched their second invasion in 1634. This led the Bhutanese to claim that the Tibetan ruler had never wanted peace and that the negotiations had been a mere strategic ploy. King Karma Tenkyong's exact motives for the invasion remain unclear, however, with Karma Phuntsho speculating that he either wanted to capture Zhabdrung, destabilize his rule in Bhutan, or obtain revered Tibetan relics that were in Bhutanese possession. In any case, the new invasion appears to have been much larger and better prepared than the one of 1619.

== The campaign ==
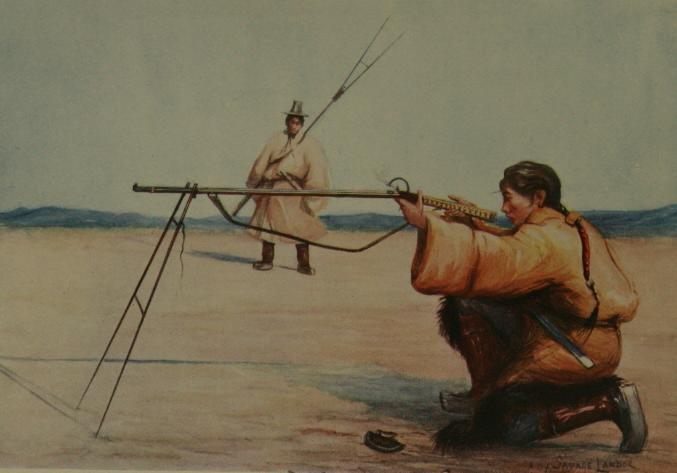
A Tibetan soldier using a matchlock. Gunpowder weapons were used on both sides of the conflict, although swords, spears and bows remained much more common.

Supported by the Bhutanese lamaist militias, King Karma Tenkyong sent five Tibetan divisions down into Bhutan: Four of these led an assault via the Paro and Gasa valleys, targeting Simtokha Dzong, while the fifth occupied the Bumthang valley, although that valley was home to the neutral Kingdom of Bumthang. Why the Tsangpa dynasty also occupied Bumthang is unknown, but John A. Ardussi speculates that either Ngawang Namgyal had a large following there or that the Tibetans at least believed it to be so. Once again, Zhabdrung's supporters rallied to his defense, but it became quickly apparent that the Tibetan-Lamaist coalition was far stronger. Deputing his political and military duties to his confidant Tenzin Drukgyal, Ngawang Namgyal retreated to Jarogang in Khothangkha, resolved to escape to India if his domain would be destroyed. As the situation for Zhabdrung's forces became increasingly dire, Tibetan troops attacked Simtokha Dzong. Equipped with large numbers of matchlocks as well as Chinese trebuchets, Karma Tenkyong's troops quickly stormed the palace. The Tibetans went on to demand hostages from Ngawang Namgyal, who only gave a defiant reply. While Tibetan soldiers were looting the dzong, however, its gunpowder stores were ignited, perhaps by accident. Simtokha Dzong, constructed just three years prior, exploded, killing most of the Tibetan forces present. As the Tibetans had been unaware of the ammunition, with the explosion seemingly coming out of nowhere, panic quickly spread among the survivors. Recognizing the chance, Zhabdrung's forces managed to overwhelm the remaining Tibetans in a counterattack. Bhutanese sources even claim that "the few [invaders] who survived, returned to Tibet with the news of a terrible defeat." Ardussi argues, however, that "it [is not] certain that the dispersal of the Tibetan and allied Bhutanese armies was complete" and that sporadic fighting in western Bhutan probably continued until 1639. After their victory at Simtokha Dzong, Ngawang Namgyal and his followers also expelled the Barawa monks from their strongholds in the Gasa valley, eliminating one rival sect from Bhutan for good.

== Aftermath ==
Even though his forces had triumphed over the Tibetan invaders and he remained in power, Ngawang Namgyal's victory was a costly one. His regime had almost collapsed and his new seat of power was destroyed, while both the Tsangpa dynasty and the rival lamas remained a constant threat to his realm. Nevertheless, Ngawang Namgyal resumed "with undiminished determination to carry on his task of state-building". After praying for the fallen soldiers at Chagri Monastery, he immediately began to seek a place to construct an even grander dzong than Simtokha. After he found one, the foundation for the new Punakha Dzong was laid in 1637; after its completion it remained the administrative centre and the seat of the Government of Bhutan until 1955, when the capital was moved to Thimphu. Simtokha Dzong, on the other hand, was only rebuilt in 1671. While Ngawang Namgyal continued to unify Bhutan, the Tibetans and their dissident Bhutanese allies launched one last invasion in 1639, but this war quickly turned into a stalemate. Meanwhile, the Tsangpa were increasingly confronted with conflicts in Tibet, so that Karma Tenkyong eventually initiated negotiations to end the conflict. Zhabdrung Rinpoche Ngawang Namgyal was recognized by the Tibetans as ruler of western Bhutan, and in the years until his death he would eliminate the sects that opposed him and also conquer much of eastern Bhutan.

== Bibliography ==
- Ardussi, John A. (1977). Bhutan before the British: A historical study. Acton, Australian Capital Territory: Australian National University.
- Karma Phuntsho (2013). The History of Bhutan. Nodia: Random House India. ISBN 9788184003116.
- Aris, Michael (1979). Bhutan. The early History of a Himalayan Kingdom. Warminster: Aris & Phillips Central Asian Studies. ISBN 978-0856681998.
- Dorji Wangmo (2006). Treasures of the thunder dragon: a portrait of Bhutan. Penguin Books, Viking Press. ISBN 0-670-99901-6.
- Harrison, Peter (2011). Fortress Monasteries of the Himalayas. Tibet, Ladakh, Nepal and Bhutan. Oxford: Osprey Publishing. ISBN 978-1849083966.
