= Karma Tenkyong =

6th Tsangpa Tibetan ruler (1606–1642)

Karma Tenkyong (1606 – Neu, Central Tibet, 1642), in full Karma Tenkyong Wangpo (Wylie: Kar ma bstan skyong dbang po), was a king of Tibet who ruled from 1620 to 1642. He belonged to the Tsangpa Dynasty which had been prominent in Tsang (West Central Tibet) since 1565. His reign was marked by the increasingly bitter struggle against the Gelugpa sect and its leader the Dalai Lama. The outcome was the crushing of the Tsangpa regime and the establishment of the Dharma-based Tibetan state that endured until 1950.

== Succession and Mongol incursion ==
Karma Tenkyong was born in 1606 as the son of the Tsangpa ruler Karma Phuntsok Namgyal. He was considered an incarnation of Chakna Dorje (Vajrapani, the protector and guide of Buddha). At that time the dynasty had entered a phase of military expansion from its bases in the Tsang region. It was strongly allied with the Buddhist hierarchs of the Karmapa (Black Hat) and Shamarpa (Red Hat) sects. In 1618, when Karma Tenkyong was twelve years old, his father successfully invaded Ü (East Central Tibet) which was a stronghold of the reformist Gelugpa sect. In that way he became the supreme ruler of Central Tibet (Ü-Tsang). The conquest was facilitated since the 4th Dalai Lama had died two years before, and no reincarnated successor had yet been found. Karma Phuntsok Namgyal died in late March 1620 (or, according to other statements, 1621, 1623, 1631 or 1632) and was succeeded by Karma Tenkyong. Since he was young, the government was handled by the nanglon Dronyer Bongong and the chilon Gangzukpa. The ministers were averse to sending representatives to the newly discovered 5th Dalai Lama, Ngawang Lobsang Gyatso, fearing the increasingly heartily contacts between the Gelugpa and the Upper Mongols at Qinghai Lake. In 1621, a Mongol detachment led by Lhatsun and Hungtaiji invaded the Ü region in support of the Gelugpa. Karma Tenkyong met them in battle at Gyathanggang but was decisively defeated. He and his soldiers were then besieged at Chakpori in Lhasa and faced with starvation and death by massacre. At that moment the Panchen Lama of Tashilhunpo and the leaders of the Ganden and Taklung monasteries intervened. These three Gelugpa dignitaries persuaded the Mongols to lift the siege in return for wide concessions. The Gelugpa received back most of the estates lost to the Tsangpa. The military camps that the latter kept in the region were abolished. For the Gelugpa leaders it was probably desirable to avoid the complete annihilation of Karma Tenkyong's forces, since they were the only effective army of Tibet and could serve as a counterweight to the Mongols. Karma Tenkyong proceeded to repair the temples in Lhasa where the ravages of the Mongols caused the religious service to lapse for two years. He also made repairs of Sakya and Taklung. Furthermore, the new ruler issued a law code.

== Character ==
Being the last of his dynasty and an enemy of the Gelugpa hierarchs, the memory of Karma Tenkyong suffered from the damnation of later Gelugpa historians. He, and the previous Tsangpa rulers, were regarded as inherently evil and opposed to Buddhism in spite of their well-attested patronage of the Karma Kagyu and Jonang sects. Contemporary clerical observers, such as Yolmo Tenzin Norbu, reacted angrily on his transgressions of the elaborate social hierarchy of Tibet, as he tried to forge a pretentious genealogy for his upstart family, going back to a disciple of Padmasambhava: "He expects all to perform prostrations to him and raise up stacks of tea offerings. He even acts like that to our lama! He rejoices in his great qualities such as the power of his blessings and magical abilities. Yet, he was unable to humble himself regarding the height of the seat [compared to the seats of the Karmapa and Shamarpa hierarchs], and so forth". Karma Tenkyong was known to his contemporaries for his hasty temper, strength, and audacious rashness, that incidentally were reminiscent of early Indian legends of Vajrapani, the deity he was believed to incarnate.

== Impressions of foreign visitors ==
In the time of Karma Tenkyong a number of Portuguese Jesuit missionaries visited Tibet. In 1628, the priests Estêvão Cacella and João Cabral arrived to the royal residence Shigatse and were received by the king. The Jesuits describe him as an intelligent and handsome man of 22, pious and generous to the poor. His palace was built on the top of a mountain, with a construction similar to a Portuguese fortress but without artillery. His court was kept with great luxury and the various rooms were gilded and painted. The personal apartment of the king contained a section where he collected curiosities. The palace had curtains of Chinese damask and other substances, the quality of which could compete with the silks of the Portuguese. While the hostile Gelugpa sources are reluctant to accord the Tsangpa ruler royal titles, European accounts point him out as the king of Ü-Tsang ('Ucangue') or Tibet. The account of the Jesuit Father Gerbillon from the late 17th century says of him: 'It was not more than 60 years ago that Tibet, that is variously called Toubet, Thibet and Tangout, was governed by a king native to that land, called Tsanpa han [Tsangpa Khan], whom the Chinese call Tsan pou in their histories. This prince was once very powerful [...]; although the grand lama who is called Dalai Lama stayed in Poutala, that our travellers called variously Botala, Lassa and Barantola, he was still not the temporal sovereign of the land; it was Tsan pa who then ruled and lost the crown in the way that I will recount.'

== Struggles with the Chogthu Mongols ==
The new Dalai Lama, born in 1617, was eventually received in the Repung monastery in 1622. Pilgrims, notables and soldiers arrived in increasing numbers from Mongolia to Central Tibet and worried Karma Tenkyong. The Tsangpa ruler gathered around him members of the old nobility and old religious communities who looked on the expansion of the Gelugpa with suspicion. In 1631, he was able to push back the Gelugpa positions so that Ngawang Lobsang Gyatso was forced to seek refuge in Nêdong, the royal seat of the Phagmodrupa dynasty. Karma Tenkyong furthermore allied with the senior ruler of the Mongols, Ligdan Khan, a convert to the Shamarpa sect. Ligdan Khan actually captured the Kokonor area in 1633 but died of smallpox in the following year, and the supreme Mongol khanate lapsed after his demise. In 1635, a new foreign invader approached Tibet. This was Arslan, son of the Shamarpa-minded khan Chogthu of the Northern Khalkha Mongols, who headed a looting expedition. The rivalling factions of Tibet attempted to draw him to their side. The Shamarpa, enjoined by Karma Tenkyong, secured a Tsangpa-Chogthu alliance. Arslan's army proceeded to ravage the Gelugpa territories, reaching Drepung and Lhasa. Then, however, the Arslan suddenly changed his allegiance, declared for the Dalai Lama and attacked the Tsangpa positions. His troops conquered Shigatse and Gyangtse but were then dispersed by another Mongol chief. Karma Tenkyong and the Shamarpa hierarch sent message to Arslan's father and denounced the conduct of his son. Chogthu sent emissaries who murdered Arslan and a few of his followers.

== Relations with Bhutan and Ladakh ==
Meanwhile, there were a few disputes with areas to the west and south. Karma Tenkyong inherited from his father a latent conflict with Ngawang Namgyal, a Drukpa cleric who had founded a polity in Bhutan in 1616. In 1634, he sent six columns that attacked Bhutan across various points of the border from Padro to Bumthang. The Tsangpa forces were able to capture the Sinmodokha palace. They demanded hostages from Ngawang Namgyal, who however gave a defiant reply. The Tibetan soldiers who had captured the palace were supposedly killed by a gunpowder explosion, and the invasion at length achieved nothing (see also Battle of Five Lamas). In 1638, a chief of the Chahar tribe of the Mongols performed a raid from Tibet into Ladakh but were repulsed by king Sengge Namgyal. Due to this there arose some tension between the Tsangpa and Ladakh, although it did not come to open warfare. The Tsang elite sent envoys to pay their respects to Sengge Namgyal. While he marched back with his army, the Ladakhi king subjugated a number of monastic fiefs and herdsmen communities in western Tibet.

== The rise of Güshi Khan ==
The disappearance of Arslan gave room for the chief of the Khoshut Mongols, Güshi Khan, to act. He had previously visited Tibet as a pilgrim and was attached to the Dalai Lama faction. After Arslan's death he attacked the Chogthu group in Kokonor in concert with the Dzungar chief Baatur Khungtaiji. The Chogthu were completely defeated in 1637, and in the next year Güshi Khan visited Dalai Lama in Lhasa. Meanwhile, Karma Tenkyong tried to counter Gelugpa influence in the east by allying with Donyo Dorje, the king of Beri in Kham. This ruler supported the Bön religion and was in particular hostile to the Gelugpa, which suffered persecution. A conspiratory letter from Donyo Dorje to Karma Tenkyong was intercepted by a Gelugpa representative. That served as a pretext for Güshi Khan to invade Kham in concert with Parik tribesmen from Amdo. Donyo Dorje was captured and executed in 1640, and in the next year the entire Kham fell under the pro-Gelugpa forces.

== Invasion of Tsang ==
The time had now come for Güshi Khan and Dalai Lama's Tibetan supporters to deal with Karma Tenkyong once and for all. Ngawang Losang Gyatso supposedly wished to avoid bloodshed but was overruled by his chief attendant Sonam Chospel. Still, the Gelugpa leadership initially held a formally neutral stance when the Mongol forces turned against Karma Tenkyong. The Panchen Lama, who resided in the Tashilhunpo monastery in Tsang, was invited to travel to Ü so that he would not be harmed by the forthcoming invasion. As it was, Karma Tenkyong was informed that Güshi Khan's army was heading towards Tsang, and proceeded to arrest the lama who was kept in detention. The Tsangpa ruler sent troops to guard the borders and erected a stockade around the capital Shigatse. However, Güshi Khan had obtained the reputation of being an invincible warlord and met with relatively weak resistance. Thirteen districts were rapidly overrun, and the Mongol forces laid siege to Shigatse. The skilful Tsangpa archers kept the attackers at bay for several months. In the meantime, Sonam Chospel secured the various Tsangpa districts in Ü through persuasion or force. Eventually, he openly showed his support for Güshi Khan's enterprise and joined the siege with a large body of soldiers.

== Death ==
While the conflict was going on, a large Tibetan delegation was dispatched to the Manchu Emperor in Mukden, Hong Taiji. The delegates brought letters from Dalai Lama, the Tsangpa and the Karmapa, asking for the emperor's mediation. However, the Manchu ruler did not wish to take the sides in the ongoing conflict. In the first month of the water-horse year 1642, Shigatse and the nearby Karmapa monastery Tashi Zilnon were taken. On the 25th day of the second month, the fortress itself surrendered and Karma Tenkyong was captured with his family and retainers. He was imprisoned in the fortress Neu near Lhasa. With this feat Güshi Khan united most of Tibet under the spiritual authority of his patron Ngawang Lobsang Gyatso. Later in the same year, a Karmapa uprising took place in several districts. The incensed Güshi Khan gave orders to execute Karma Tenkyong together with his ministers Dronyer Bongong and Gangzukpa. The ex-ruler was administered the capital punishment ko-thumgyab-pa, which in Tibet is reserved for upper class offenders. He was put in an ox-hide bag and thrown in the Tsangpo river near Neu.

Preceded by Karma Phuntsok Namgyal	Ruler of Tibet; 1620–1642	Succeeded by 5th Dalai Lama and Güshi Khan
