= Kingdom of Bumthang =

Small kingdom in Bhutan from c. 7th to 17th century

Coordinates: 27°33′N 90°43′E

Kingdom of Bumthang བུམ་ཐང་
- before 7th century–17th century
- Capital: Chakhar Gutho Palace, Jakar Dzong
- Common languages: Bumthang language, Chöke
- Religion: Bön, Buddhism
- Government: Monarchy
- King (Chogyal)
- Historical era: Late Antiquity
  - Established: before 7th century
  - Zhabdrung Ngawang Namgyal begins consolidating control in Bhutan: 1616
  - Disestablished: 17th century
  - Bumthang noble Jigme Namgyal, forefather of the House of Wangchuck, gains control of Trongsa Province and Bumthang Province: 19th century

The Kingdom of Bumthang was one of several small kingdoms within the territory of modern Bhutan before the first consolidation under Zhabdrung Ngawang Namgyal in 1616. After initial consolidation, the Bumthang Kingdom became Bumthang Province, one of the nine Provinces of Bhutan. The region was roughly analogous to modern-day Bumthang District. It was again consolidated into the modern Kingdom of Bhutan in 1907.

The Kingdom of Bumthang is particularly notable among its many contemporary Bhutanese chiefdoms because it was here that Buddhism first took root in Bhutan. The kingdom also contained several places relevant to particularly Bhutanese legends. The kingdom is also the ancestral homeland of the House of Wangchuck, which was among local elite families that surpassed the erstwhile Tibetan aristocracy. During Bhutan's early history, Bumthang served as a locus of exile for both Tibetan and Indian rulers, and as the home of Buddhist saint Pema Lingpa.

== Arrival of Buddhism ==
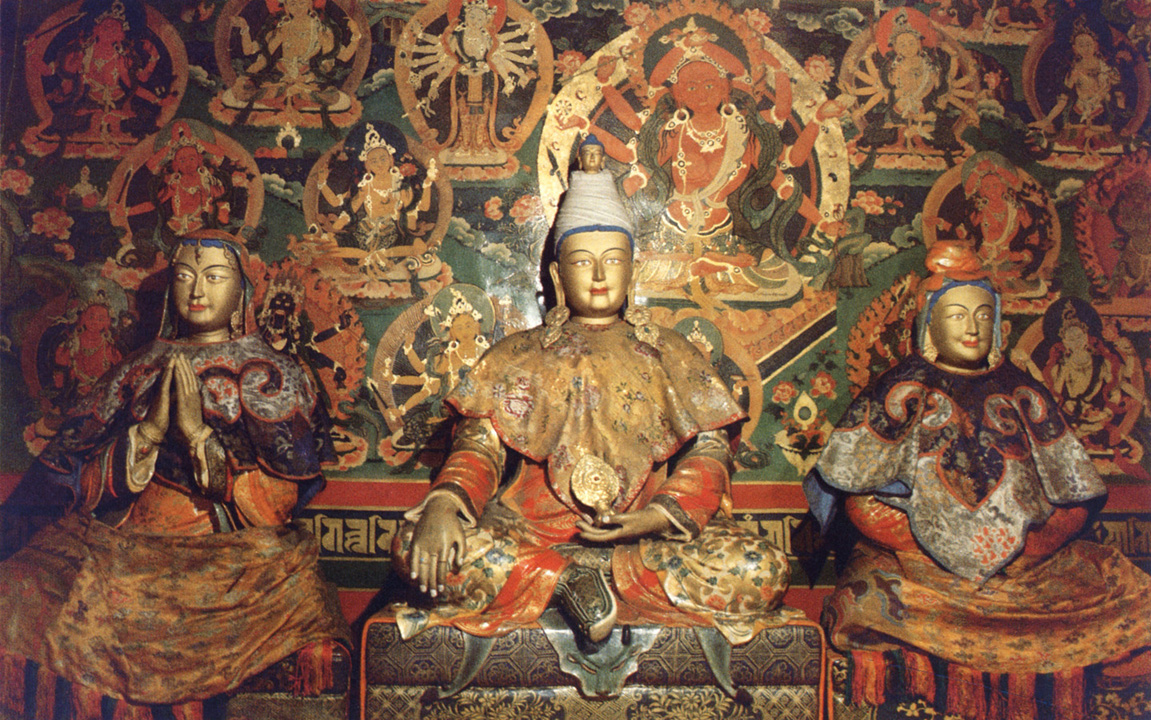
Songtsän Gampo

Buddhism was first introduced to Bhutan in the 7th century AD. Tibetan king Songtsän Gampo (reigned 627–49), a convert to Buddhism, ordered the construction of two Buddhist temples, at Bumthang in central Bhutan and at Kyichu (near Paro) in the Paro Valley.

Buddhism replaced but did not eliminate the Bön religious practices that had also been prevalent in Tibet until the late 6th century. Instead, Buddhism absorbed Bön and its believers. As the country developed in its many fertile valleys, Buddhism matured and became a unifying element. It was Buddhist literature and chronicles that began the recorded history of Bhutan.

Buddhism was propagated in earnest in 746 under King Sindhu Rāja (also Künjom; Sendha Gyab; Chakhar Gyalpo), an exiled Indian king who had established a government in Bumthang at Chakhar Gutho Palace. The king was engaged in a war against King Nawuchhe, another Indian king to the south, during which the king fell physically ill due to possession by a Bön demon. The king's illness was reportedly brought on by the loss of his son Tala Mebar in the war, and his subsequent abandonment of his guardian spirit ("Phola") and commission of various impure acts. This caused Seling Karpo, the chief of the Lhaday (gods and demons), to revoke the soul of the king.

Upon the advice of a minor fief, Sindhu Rāja invited Padmasambhava to exorcise the demon and cure his illness. Upon arrival, the saint requested a Tantric consort (Zungma), and in reply the king offered his daughter Lhachig Bumden Tshomo (Menmo Tashi Kyeden), who possessed twenty-one marks of a dakini. After capturing the demon and converting it to Buddhism, Guru Rinpoche cured the Bumthang king. The king himself also converted to Buddhism and went on to found several pilgrimage sites including Kuje Temple. As a result, many mountains and deities worshipped by Bönpa were incorporated into local Buddhism.

The king's daughter went to live in the cave of Dorji Tsepa, where her Guru meditated. She acted as Dupdemo, whose duty was to fetch water and help the Guru in his religious activities. She came to be known as Machig Bumden ("single mother") because of her reputable religious service.

== Bumthang in legend ==
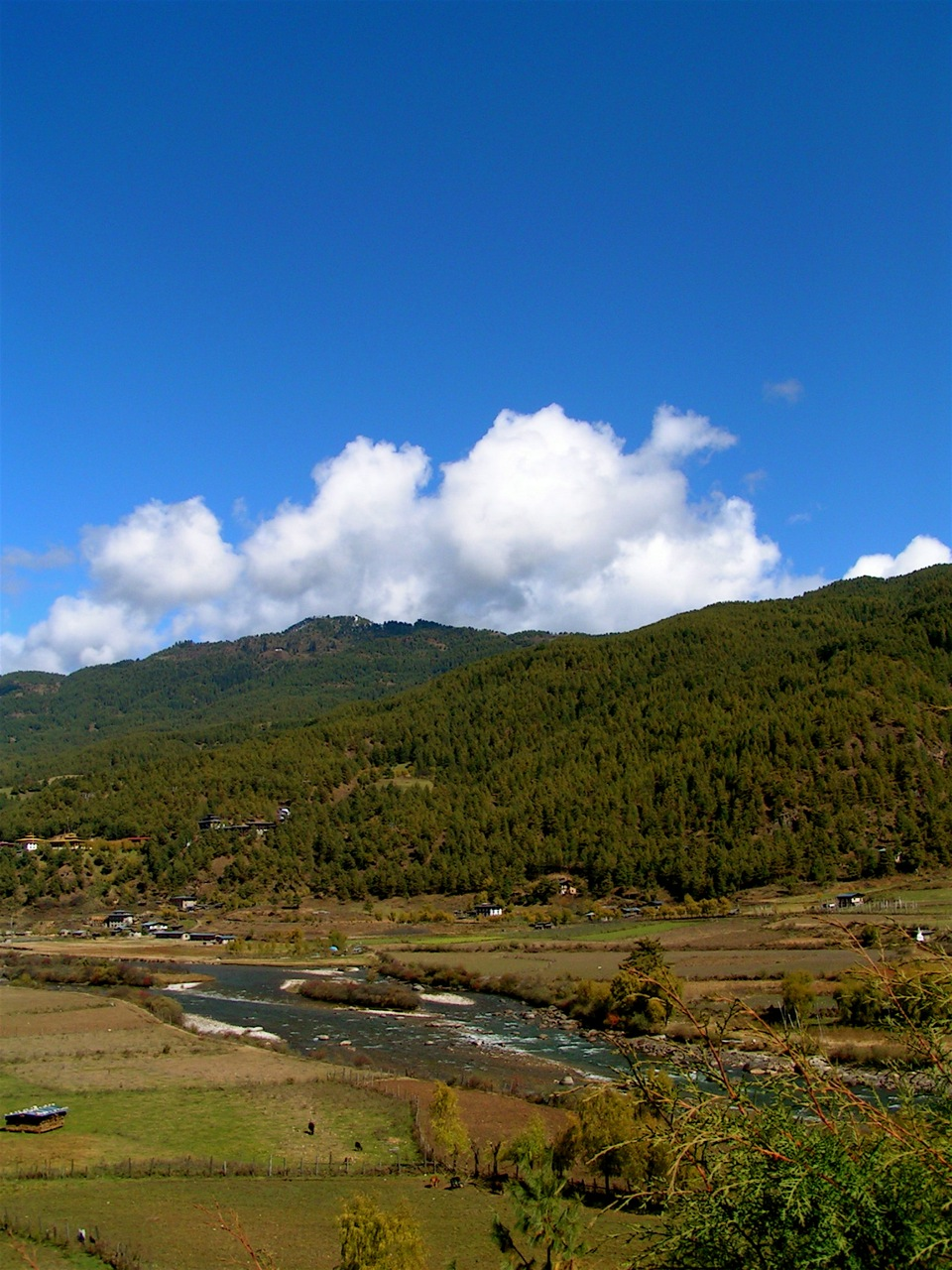
Bumthang countryside

The Bumthang Kingdom enjoys a place in some of the legends of ancient Bhutan. The oldest lies behind a notable Jakar temple. Bumthang's Jambey Lhakhang was, according to legend, one of 108 temples built in a single night by Songtsen Gampo (605 or 617?–649). Jambey Lhakhang was destroyed by demons who prevented its reconstruction. To drive them off, villagers danced naked under the full moon, causing the demons confusion and panic. To celebrate the legend, a local dance festival is held at the Lhakhang yearly.

Some later Buddhists in the region laid claim to Buddhist roots predating Buddhism itself, in King Drime Kunden and the prior incarnations of Buddha, between 2000 and 1000 BC.

The Mebar, or Burning Lake, is named for the legend of lama Pema Lingpa, who entered the lake to find a holy treasure, emerging not only with the relic, but with his lamp still burning.

Legend also holds that a zealot lama built chortens along a road in Bumthang in order to propagate Buddhism in early times. He named each chorten with the suffix -ji, meaning "berry," after bundles of his blessed berries fell along the route.

== Consolidation ==
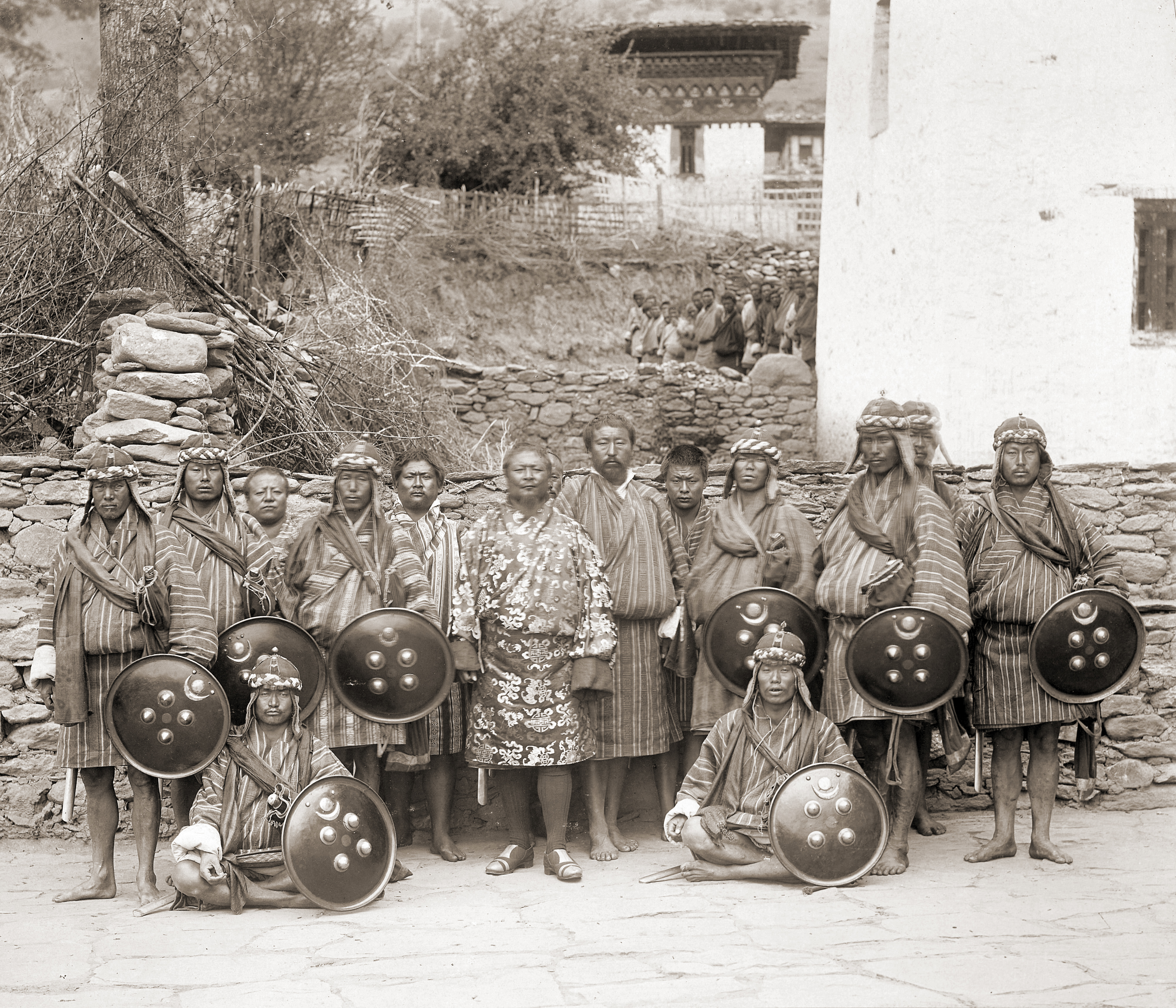
Penlop of Trongsa Ugyen Wangchuck, lord of Trongsa Province, Paro Province, and de facto head of Bumthang Province.

The decline of the Kingdom of Bumthang began with the consolidation of Bhutan by Zhabdrung Ngawang Namgyal in 1616. The Zhabdrung, fending off invasions from Tibet, later established effective control of central and eastern Bhutan, including Bumthang, after a series of battles through his lieutenant Chogyal Minjur Tenpa (1613–1680; r. 1667–1680). Minjur Tenpa was the first Penlop of Trongsa (Tongsab), appointed by Zhabdrung Ngawang Namgyal. He was born Damchho Lhundrub in Min-Chhud, Tibet, and led a monastic life from childhood. Before his appointment as Tongsab, he held the appointed post of Umzey (Chant Master).

A trusted follower of the Zhabdrung, Minjur Tenpa was sent to subdue kings of Bumthang, Lhuentse, Trashigang, Zhemgang, and other lords from Trongsa Dzong. After doing so, the Tongsab divided his control in the east among eight regions (Shachho Khorlo Tsegay), overseen by Dungpas and Kutshabs (civil servants). He went on to build Jakar, Lhuentse, Trashigang, and Zhemgang Dzongs. From this time, the status of the independent kingdom was reduced to semi-independent Bumthang Province, whose dzongpen (governor) answered to Trongsa.

== Legacy ==
The legacy of the Kingdom of Bumthang is demonstrated in its religious and political significance in modern Bhutan. The wider Bhutanese nobility, including the modern royal House of Wangchuck, emerged from roots in the Bumthang Kingdom.

=== Bumthang nobility ===
The Bumthang nobility constitutes a broad historical upper class in the Bumthang, Kheng, and Mongar (Zhongar) regions. The local term for such noble families is dung (Dzongkha: དུང་/གདུང་; Wylie: dung/gdung; "bone, horn, shell"). The two main branches of the nobility are the Ura and Mongar. (Note: The specific title of dung is normally applied to Ura and Kheng families, as opposed to Mongar families.) As such, there are two traditional accounts as to the origin of the nobility: the Ura and Mongar traditions. Both involve claims of half divine parentage, and merge with the historical figure Lhawang Dragpa, who was from central Tibet.

According to the account from Ura, the kingdom had no heir at the death of King Chikhatharö. As Bumthang subjects quarreled, they also prayed to the God of Heaven. The God of Heaven sent his son, who entered a village woman's womb and was born as Lhagon Pelchen and became king. After three generations, the royal line again extinguished, but not before Lhagon Pelchen's grandson gave instructions on finding his next incarnation. His survivors went to central Tibet and dropped fruit from the Monpa region, kidnapping the child who gathered the most and bringing him back to Ura. This youth became Lhawang Dragpa. As an adult, he looked into his actual origins and found that he was descended from the son of Tibetan king Langdarma. Pleased with his royal pedigree, he remained in Bumthang and married a noblewoman from Trongsa (Chökhor).

According to the Mongar account, however the God of Heaven, in the form of a snake, impregnated the betrothed of King Dungsamkha. The offspring took the form of a fish, and was caught in the net of a fisherman who decided to keep him alive upon discovering he could speak. The fish turned into a child while the fisherman was at work, performing chores for his host. While in this form, this fisherman one day threw out the fish skin, leaving the child a human. The half-god was made chief of the region and won control of Ura and Mongar. Before his death, he predicted he would be reincarnated as a child in central Tibet who would seize the most shells. The child identified was Lhawang Dragpa.

Other independent nobility also took root in Bumthang. These other families are called Shelngo. After the assassination of Langdarma in 841, the family of his assassin, Lhalung Pelkyi Dorje, reportedly fled to Bumthang via Phari and Paro, and to Kurtö via Lhodra. One of the Bumthang descendants became a Penlop of Trongsa, while the others ruled parts of the east.

=== House of Wangchuck ===
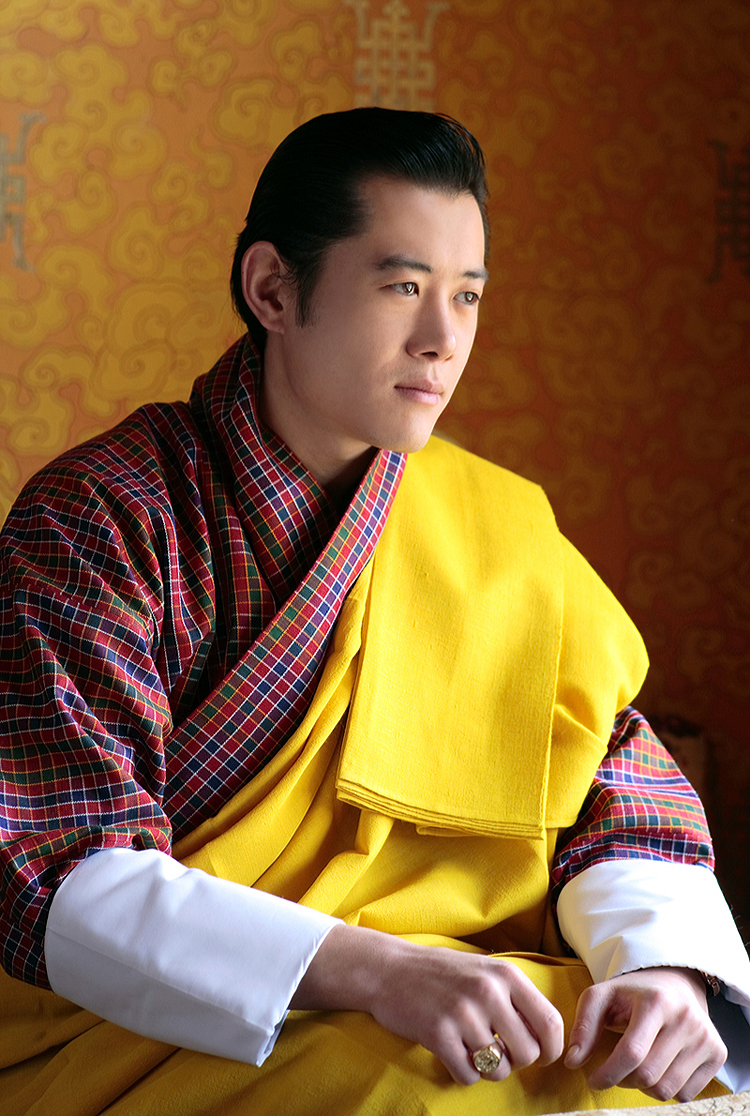
Fifth Druk Gyalpo Jigme Khesar Namgyel Wangchuck, current head of the House of Wangchuck

The Kingdom of Bumthang is the ancestral land of the House of Wangchuck. Wangchuck family originated in the Bumthang region of central Bhutan well after consolidation. The family belongs to the Nyö clan, and is descended from Pema Lingpa, a Bhutanese Nyingmapa saint. The Nyö clan emerged as a local aristocracy, supplanting many older aristocratic families of Tibetan origin that sided with Tibet during invasions of Bhutan. In doing so, the clan came to occupy the hereditary position of Penlop of Trongsa, as well as significant national and local government positions.

The Penlop of Trongsa controlled central Bhutan; the rival Penlop of Paro controlled western Bhutan; and dzongpons controlled areas surrounding their respective dzongs. The Penlop of Paro, unlike Trongsa, was an office appointed by the Druk Desi's central government. Because western regions controlled by the Penlop of Paro contained lucrative trade routes, it became the object of competition among aristocratic families.

Although Bhutan generally enjoyed favorable relations with both Tibet and British India through the 19th century, extension of British power at Bhutan's borders as well as Tibetan incursions in British Sikkim defined politically opposed pro-Tibet and pro-Britain forces. This period of intense rivalry between and within western and central Bhutan, coupled with external forces from Tibet and especially the British Empire, provided the conditions for the ascendancy of the Penlop of Trongsa.

After the Duar War with Britain (1864–65) as well as substantial territorial losses (Cooch Behar 1835; Assam Duars 1841), armed conflict turned inward. In 1870, amid the continuing civil wars, the 10th Trongsa Penlop Jigme Namgyal ascended to the office of Druk Desi. In 1879, he appointed his 17-year-old son Ugyen Wangchuck as Penlop of Paro. Jigme Namgyal reigned through his death 1881, punctuated by periods of retirement during which he retained effective control of the country.

The pro-Britain 12th Trongsa Penlop Ugyen Wangchuck ultimately prevailed against the pro-Tibet and anti-Britain Penlop of Paro after a series of civil wars and rebellions between 1882 and 1885. After his father's death in 1881, Ugyen Wangchuck entered a feud over the post of Penlop of Trongsa. In 1882, at the age of 20, he marched on Bumthang and Trongsa, winning the post of Penlop of Trongsa in addition to Paro. In 1885, Ugyen Wangchuck intervened in a conflict between the Dzongpens of Punakha and Thimphu, sacking both sides and seizing Simtokha Dzong. From this time forward, the office of Desi became purely ceremonial.

== See also ==
- Buddhism in Bhutan
- Bumthang District
- Bumthang language
- Bumthang Province
- House of Wangchuck
- Penlop of Trongsa
