= Khunpang Lhawang Dorje =

2nd Tsangpa Tibetan ruler (?-1605/1606)

Khunpang Lhawang Dorje (Wylie: K'un spangs lha dbang rdo rje) (died 1605 or 1606) was a prince of the Tsangpa Dynasty who held power in parts of Central Tibet, especially Tsang (West Central Tibet), between 1565 and 1642.

== Family background ==
Khunpang Lhawang Dorje was one of the nine sons of the king of Upper Tsang, Karma Tseten, who founded the dynasty in 1565. He was considered by some as the incarnation of Bernagchen, the two-armed Mahakala who is the protector of the Karma Kagyu sect. When his father was still alive, he became involved in a dispute among a regional noble family, the Changdakpa. Two brothers called Namkha Gyaltsen and Tashi Tobgyal were in disagreement. Khunpang Lhawang Dorje supported the elder brother. His father Karma Tseten endorsed his judgment and banned the junior brother Tashi Tobgyal from Tsang, forcing him in exile to Ü (East Central Tibet). Tashi Tobgyal (1550?–1603) was a disciple of the Nyingma lama Jampa Chokyi Gyaltsen and well versed in tantric practices. In order to exact revenge, he performed tantric rituals which supposedly killed Karma Tseten. Possibly, this happened in 1599.

== Co-reigning with his brothers ==
Khunpang Lhawang Dorje was co-ruler of Tsang for a while. His exact dates are not known, but according to one list, he ruled already in the year 1582, in the time of his father. After the demise of Karma Tseten, a division took place between Khunpang Lhawang Dorje and two of his brothers, Karma Thutob Namgyal (d. 1610) and Karma Tensung (d. 1609 or 1611). Khunpang Lhawang Dorje resided in the Samdrubtse castle (in present Shigatse), the main base of the dynasty, and took care of government affairs from there. He entertained good contacts with the Jonang lama Taranatha and the Shamarpa hierarch Chokyi Wangchuk who visited him on a number of occasions, gave ritual sanction to his political authority, and gave him advice on how to arrange his daily life. However, in the historical sources he is entirely overshadowed by his younger brother Karma Tensung who appears to have been the main ruler over Tsang. Khunpang Lhawang Dorje was taken ill in 1604 and Taranatha was asked to perform a geg ritual to drive away demons from the old and ailing ruler, who suffered from failing memory. This seemed to help for a while, but the illness soon returned, and he died after about a year, in 1605 or 1606.

Preceded by Karma Tseten	Ruler of Tsang c. 1582–1605/06	Succeeded by Karma Tensung
