= Karma Tseten =

1st Tsangpa Tibetan ruler (?-1599)

Karma Tseten (Tibetan: ཀརྨ་ཚེ་བརྟན, Wylie: karma tshe-brtan) (died 1599), also known as Zhingshak Tseten Dorje (Tibetan: ཞིངཥག་ཚེ་བརྟན་རྡོ་རྗེ, Wylie: zhing-shag tshe-brtan rdo-rje) was a king of Upper Tsang in West Central Tibet. He was the founder of the Tsangpa Dynasty, which had an important role in the history of Tibet from 1565 to 1642. Karma ruled during the period 1565–1599.

== Rebelling against the Rinpungpa ==
Karma Tseten Dorje belonged to a clan from Nyag which claimed descent from Jñanakumara, a disciple of the eighth-century tantric master Padmasambhava. In fact he does not seem to have belonged to any noble house. At that time, the Rinpungpa Dynasty held superior power in the Tsang region and was somehow related to Karma Tseten's lineage.

Coming from relatively modest circumstances, Karma Tseten was used by the Tsang ruler for various tasks, such as chief groom and tax collector. In 1548, he was entrusted with the governorship of the Samdrubtse castle in Shigatse. This was a place of great strategical importance in Tsang.

Some years later he began to plot against his Rinpungpa master. According to a picturesque but maybe apocryphical story he obtained a written permit to collect 300 sewing needles from the local population. As the words for needle and armour are very similar in Tibetan, Karma Tseten made a slight change in the document, and could thus collect 300 suits of armour.

In 1557, according to one source, he raised the standard of rebellion, helped by the discontent with the Rinpungpa among vassals such as Narthang, Norkhyung, and Gyatso. According to another eyewitness account, he bided his time until 1565, when he was appointed magpon (general). Then he started an uprising that took the Rinpungpa ruler Ngawang Jigme Drakpa by complete surprise. The situation was made worse for the Rinpungpa since some nobles close to them committed treason. Karma Tseten was able to take Panam Lhundrup Kyungtse and the Pakmori Gold Castle from Drakpa. The latter was besieged and captured; one of his sons was imprisoned while another one was killed. The Drukpa lama Kunkhyen Pema Karpo was able to mediate between the warring parties.

However, just after the Tibetan new year in 1566, fresh fighting broke out in lower Nyangtö. The Drukpa lama intervened again. Karma Tseten requested all the lands above Jomo Kharek (a mountain at the border between Ü and Tsang), but was finally content with the entire Panam area. With these events the Rinpungpa faded into insignificance.

== Political and religious program ==
After 1565-66 Karma Tseten, who was also known as Zhingshagpa, declared himself Tsangtö Gyalpo, King of Upper Tsang. The new royal line did not have the prestige of families descended from the ancient Tibetan kings; in fact, their status as an upstart dynasty may have contributed to their hasty end in 1642.

The 16th century was marked by a relative decline of secular noble houses in comparison to the main Buddhist sects, such as the Gelugpa and Karma Kagyu, which formed comprehensive ritual alliances with political repercussions. In this volatile political-religious landscape it was important for a new ruler to find support from the sects. The 9th Karmapa hierarch, Wangchuk Dorje, met Karma Tseten in 1567, and again in 1585 and 1590. The meetings seem to have been accompanied by the transfer of tutelary deities to the king.

The dynasty founded by Karma Tseten also kept good relations with representatives of the Jonang, Sakya and Nyingma sects. The overall strategical aim of his rule was to keep Tibet free from the encroaching Mongols who began to ally with the Third Dalai Lama, Sonam Gyatso, in his time. He wished to bring back the institutions of the old Tibetan Empire in order to achieve a well-governed and prosperous Tsang.

Karma Tseten and his offspring do not seem to have had any relations with the Ming Dynasty of China.

== King of Upper Tsang ==
Karma Tseten's dynastic regime became known as the Tsangpa, after the Tsang region.

He made friendly overtures to the Phagmodrupa dynasty, the weak line of kings in Nêdong in Ü (East Central Tibet). He also made contacts with the Mongols of the Kokonor region, and secured a promise of assistance from the Chogthu tribe. He furthermore undertook expansion towards western Tibet, where the territories Latö Lho and Latö Chang were placed under his authority. This was probably just a case of loose overlordship, since these areas had to be reconquered by his grandson Karma Phuntsok Namgyal in 1612–13.

The Rinpungpa tried to revive their fortunes and performed an abortive raid on Kyishö in Ü in 1575. Possibly connected to this, Karma Tseten clashed with the Rinpungpa in the next year. The Karmapa and Shamarpa hierarchs stepped in to mediate in the conflict.

A new war flared up in 1588-89 between Rong, the heartland of the Rinpungpa, and Karma Tseten. In the following year 1590, the Rinpungpa finally had to capitulate which, according to the influential exorcist Sogdogpa, was "just as the stream of earlier and later wars had become like water reaching a boil". The event fulfilled the prophecy "the polity of Tsang will become a stable alliance" and the region henceforth enjoyed a certain inner stability.

However, Central Tibet was repeatedly threatened by incursions of Mongol groups. In 1587, they reached Oyug close to Rinpung, and in 1596, they roamed a wide area including Purang, Mustang, Dolpo in Nepal, Mount Kailash, Latö, and Chang. The partial failure of the Mongol raids was attributed to the powerful exorcism of Sogdogpa.

== Family and death ==
Karma Tseten had nine sons, of which the most prominent were Karma Thutob Namgyal, Khunpang Lhawang Dorje and Karma Tensung. Of these, Khunpang Lhawang Dorje intervened in a local feud where two brothers of the Changdakpa line quarreled, and favoured the elder brother. Karma Tseten forced the younger brother Tashi Tobgyal (1550?-1603) in exile to Ü. The vengeful Tashi Tobgyal performed tantric rites, with the supposed result that Karma Tseten died from "the sharp pain from Vishnu's sword". The year of his demise is given differently in the literature, but according to the near-contemporary text Sogdog gyi tsulgyi logyu he died in 1599. The details of his succession are likewise unclear; his sons Khunpang Lhawang Dorje and Karma Thutob Namgyal are mentioned as rulers in 1582 and 1586 respectively. The next important Tsangpa king was Karma Tensung who seems to have taken over the throne in 1599.

| Preceded by Ngawang Jigme Drakpa | Ruler of Tsang; 1565–1599 | Succeeded by Karma Thutob Namgyal, Khunpang Lhawang Dorje and Karma Tensung |
