= Karma Tensung =

4th Tsangpa Tibetan ruler (?-1611)

Karma Tensung (died 1611), in full Karma Tensung Wangpo (Wylie: Kar ma bstan srung dbang po), was a king of Tsang (West Central Tibet) who probably reigned from 1599 to 1611. He belonged to the Tsangpa Dynasty that ruled parts of Tibet from 1565 to 1642.

== Background ==
Karma Tensung was one of the nine sons of Karma Tseten, the ruler of Upper Tsang who founded the dynasty in 1565. He was a supposed reincarnation of the ancient epic hero Gesar. His elder brothers were Khunpang Lhawang Dorje (d. 1605/06) and Karma Thutob Namgyal (d. 1610), who are also mentioned as rulers in some sources. A few texts speak of a son of Karma Tseten called Padma Karpo who would have assisted his father in establishing the power basis of the dynasty. It has been suggested that this Padma Karpo is the same person as Karma Tensung. When he grew up, he was taught by his father to use his hands in manual labour, and he also learnt to read and write and received religious instruction. Like the previous rulers of Tsang, he was a supporter of the Karmapa and Jonang sects. At length, he and his family emerged as opponents of the reformist Gelugpa sect that was based in Ü (East Central Tibet).

== Reign ==
Karma Tensung took over the kingship of Upper Tsang at some stage in the late sixteenth century; the extant literature mentions the dates 1588 and 1599 of which the last-mentioned may be the more probable. Although he shared the lordship over Tsang with Khunpang Lhawang Dorje and Karma Thutob, he was clearly the dominating figure among the brothers. The king resided in Panam Norbu Kyungtse, east of Samdrubtse. Early in his reign, in 1600–01, he had to cope with a threatening invasion of Tibet by the Mongol khan Khatan; he was eventually able to expel Khatan's army from Yangpachen, the estate of his ally the Shamarpa lama. However, he also strengthened the ties to some Mongols that his father had initiated. According to one version, he was married to Sonam Palgyi Butri, a daughter of the Kyishö lord in the Lhasa area. She gave birth to a daughter but the couple subsequently separated. Sonam Palgyi Butri then married Tenpai Nyima, of the abbot family of Ralung, and gave birth to Ngawang Namgyal (1594–1651?), the founder of Bhutan. All this may explain part of the hostility between the Tsangpa and Ngawang Namgyal later on. Karma Tensung's reign saw considerable territorial expansion of Tsangpa power. Four large regions of southern Tibet were subdued, as well as territories in western and northern Tibet. At that time, there was no central authority in Ü, since the Gelugpa were still not a governing power. The Gelugpa head at the time was the Fourth Dalai Lama Yonten Gyatso (1589–1616), a Mongol prince. He arrived to Tibet in 1602, but conflicts soon flared up with the Red Hat sub-sect of the Karmapa. As the protector of the Red Hats, Karma Tensung invaded Ü in 1604 and seized Phanyul. In 1605 his Tsangpa troops turned against the Gelugpa and defeated his former in-laws of Kyishö. Some 5,000 monks and laymen are said to have been massacred on the hills behind the monasteries Drepung and Sera.

== Religious patronage and death ==
Karma Tensung had a close relationship with the main incarnate lamas of the Karma Kagyu sect, and with the renowned scholar Taranatha of the Jonang sect. The latter was the foremost ritualist of the Tsangpa and readily employed curses and rituals against Karma Tensung's enemies in Ü. In 1608, the king led the troops to counter the Mongol presence in Ü and reached Phanyul, not far from Lhasa. Taranatha gave the ruler a somewhat ambiguous prognostication: "Whatever wild and unruly thought might arise in the mind of the regent Karma Tensung, it seems that the blessings of the Karmapa, Father and Son will serve to protect him. Others will be unable to protect those whose karma reaches its fruition today. Right now this is how I evaluate the lifespan of the regent." Taranatha also advised the king to perform meritorious deeds, which he did, such as the lifting of corvée obligations for the local population. Nevertheless, Karma Tensung was afflicted by tumours in the next year. Powerful relics were collected to ameliorate his condition, but he soon died. The date is given in a source as 20 February 1609, though most sources state that he died in 1611. He was succeeded by his nephew Karma Phuntsok Namgyal, possibly after a brief term by the latter's father Karma Thutob Namgyal. However, Karma Phuntsok Namgyal is mentioned as a Tsangpa leader(1603) already in a source.

Preceded by Karma Tseten	Ruler of Tsang; 1599–1611	Succeeded by Karma Phuntsok Namgyal
