= Dbus =

Dbus may refer to:

- Ü (region), a region of Tibet, rendered as "Dbus" using Wylie transliteration
  - the Central Tibetan language of this province
  - the Standard Tibetan language, based on a dialect of the earlier Dbus language
- D-Bus, a software communication protocol
