= Karma Thutob Namgyal =

3rd Tsangpa Tibetan ruler (?-1610)

Karma Thutob Namgyal (Tibetan: ཀར་མ་མཏའུ་སྟོབས་རྣམ་རྒྱལ, Wylie: Kar ma mt'u stobs rnam rgyal; died 17 October 1610) was a prince of the Tsangpa Dynasty that ruled parts of Central Tibet from 1565 to 1642.

== Family and offspring ==
Karma Thutob Namgyal was the son of the king of Upper Tsang, Karma Tseten, who founded the dynasty in 1565. He was considered to be a reincarnation of an ancient Tibetan chogyal (religious king). A text refers to him as the Depa Tsangtö, ruler of Upper Tsang, but it is not known when he started to reign. However, he resided in the Samdrubtse castle in Shigatse around 1586, probably while his father was still alive. There he received the cleric Sakya Dorje Nyima Pal Zangpo. Sakya Dorje performed a protective ceremony and made a talisman for Karma Thutob Namgyal in order to ensure the continuation of his line. Ponsa Yargyabpa, a Yargyab princess who was the consort of the ruler, became pregnant and gave birth to Karma Phuntsok Namgyal (1587–1620).

== Co-ruler of Tsang ==
When the old Karma Tseten died from an epileptic attack, apparently in 1599, three of his nine sons divided the kingship between them. Khunpang Lhawang Dorje (d. 1605/06) resided in the main stronghold of the dynasty, Samdrubtse, while the place of residence of Karma Thutob is not clear from the texts. However, the main force in the dynasty was the third brother Karma Tensung (d. 1609 or 1611) who led successful military expeditions against Ü (East Central Tibet). Like the other members of the family, Karma Thutob entertained good relations with the Karma Kagyu sect of Buddhism and invited Wangchuk Dorje, the 9th Karmapa. Nevertheless, he is not known to have been an active figure and apparently stood entirely in the shadow of Karma Tensung. His date of demise is given as 17 October 1610. It was his son Karma Phuntsok Namgyal who became the real founder of Tsangpa's power over Central Tibet in the early 17th century.

Preceded by Karma Tseten	Ruler of Tsang c. 1586–1610	Succeeded by Karma Tensung
