= Jampa Lhakhang =

Buddhist Temple in Bumthang, Bhutan

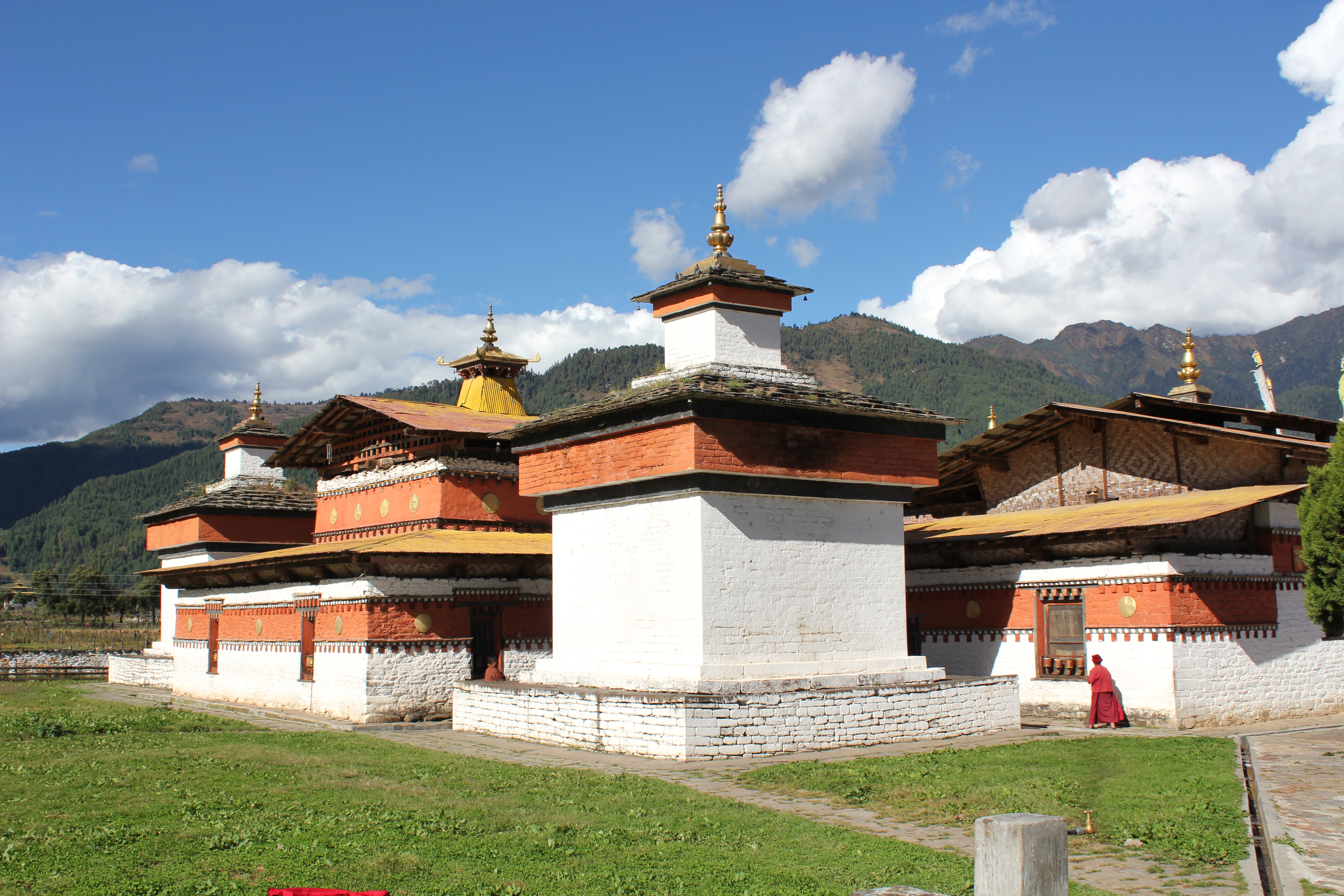

- Location within Bhutan

Religion
- Affiliation: Tibetan Buddhism

Location
- Location: Jakar, Bhutan
- Country: Bhutan
- Interactive map of Jampa Lhakhang
- Coordinates: 27°34′31″N 90°44′1″E

Architecture
- Established: 659; 1367 years ago

The Jampa Temple (Tibetan: བྱམས་པ་ལྷ་ཁང, Wylie: byams pa, THL Jampé Lhakhang) or Temple of Maitreya is located in Bumthang (Jakar) in Bhutan, and is said to be one of the 108 temples built by Tibetan King Songtsen Gampo in 659 CE on a single day, to pin down an ogress to earth forever.

== Legend ==
It was divined that the supine demoness was causing obstruction to the spread of Buddhism, and temples were constructed on her body parts that spread across Tibet, Bhutan and the borderlands. The best known of these temples are Jokhang in Lhasa, Kichu in Paro, Bhutan and Jambay Lhakhang in Bumthang District, Bhutan.

Other, lesser-known temples in Bhutan have been destroyed, but it is believed that, among others, Könchogsum in Bumthang, Khaine in Lhuntse and two temples in Haa District may have part of these 108 temples. Jambay Lhakhang was visited by Padmasambhava and restored by King Sindhu Raja after the former returned his life force. It has been repaired and rebuilt several times over time.

== Jambay Lhakhang Drup ==
Jampa Lhakhang is known for the famous festival, Jambay Lhakhang Drup held in October every year. It is a five-day festival held from the 15th to the 19th of the 9th Bhutanese month in the courtyard of Jambay Lhakhang. Jambay Lhakhang Drup commemorates the construction of the Lhakhang and honor of Guru Rinpoche who consecrated the Lhakhang. It is annually held from the 15th to the 19th of the 9th Bhutanese month as per the Bhutanese calendar.

Jambay Lhakhang

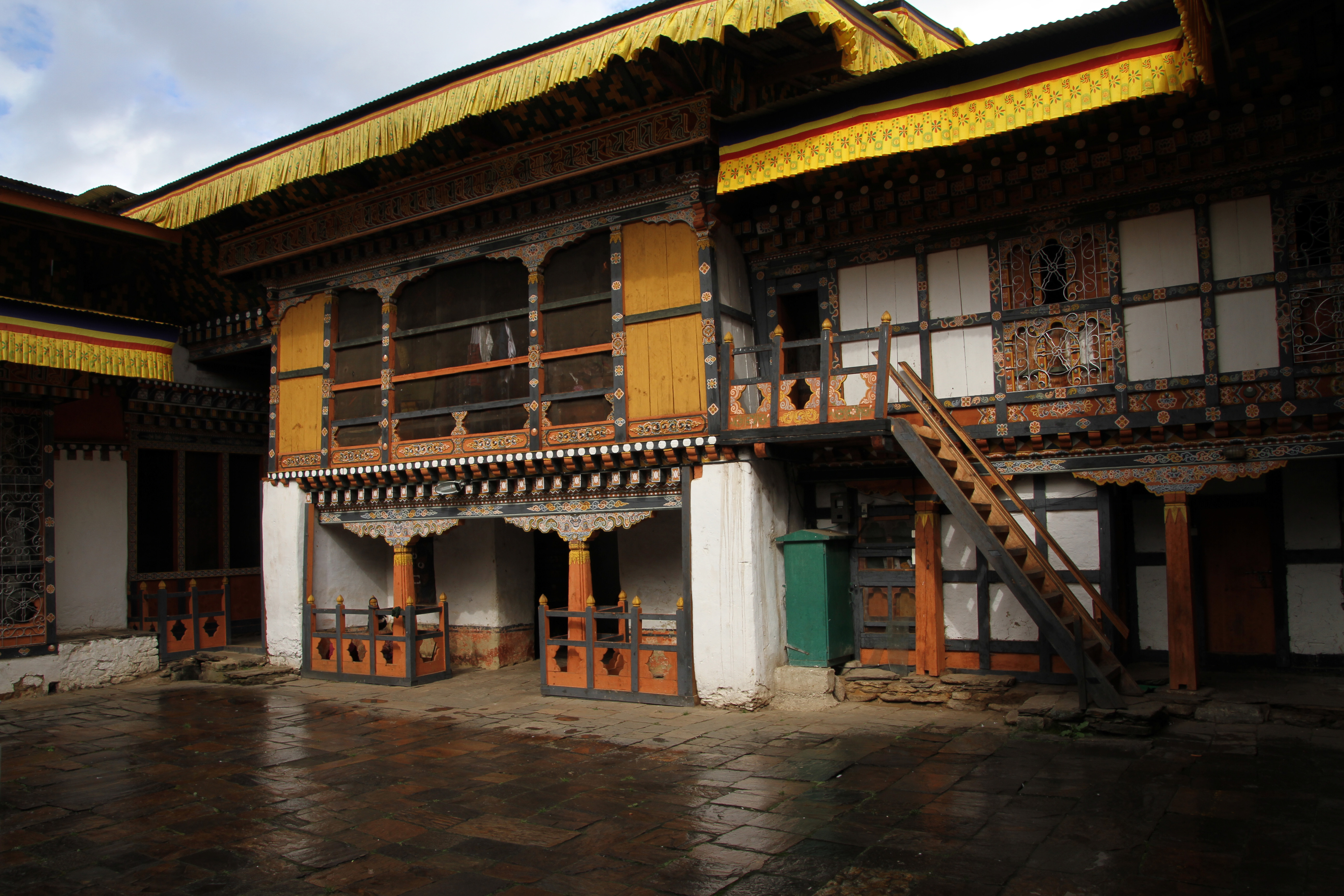

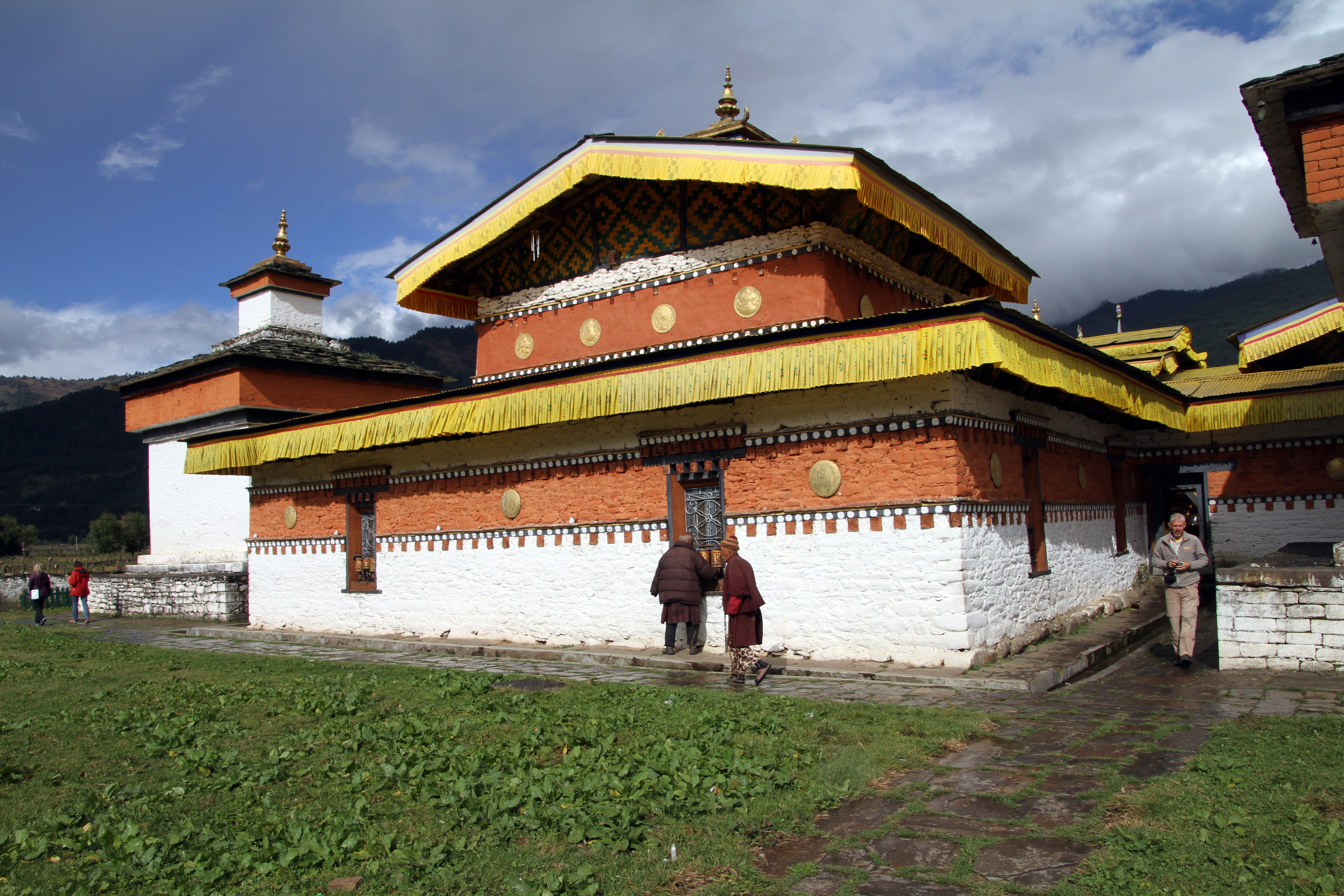

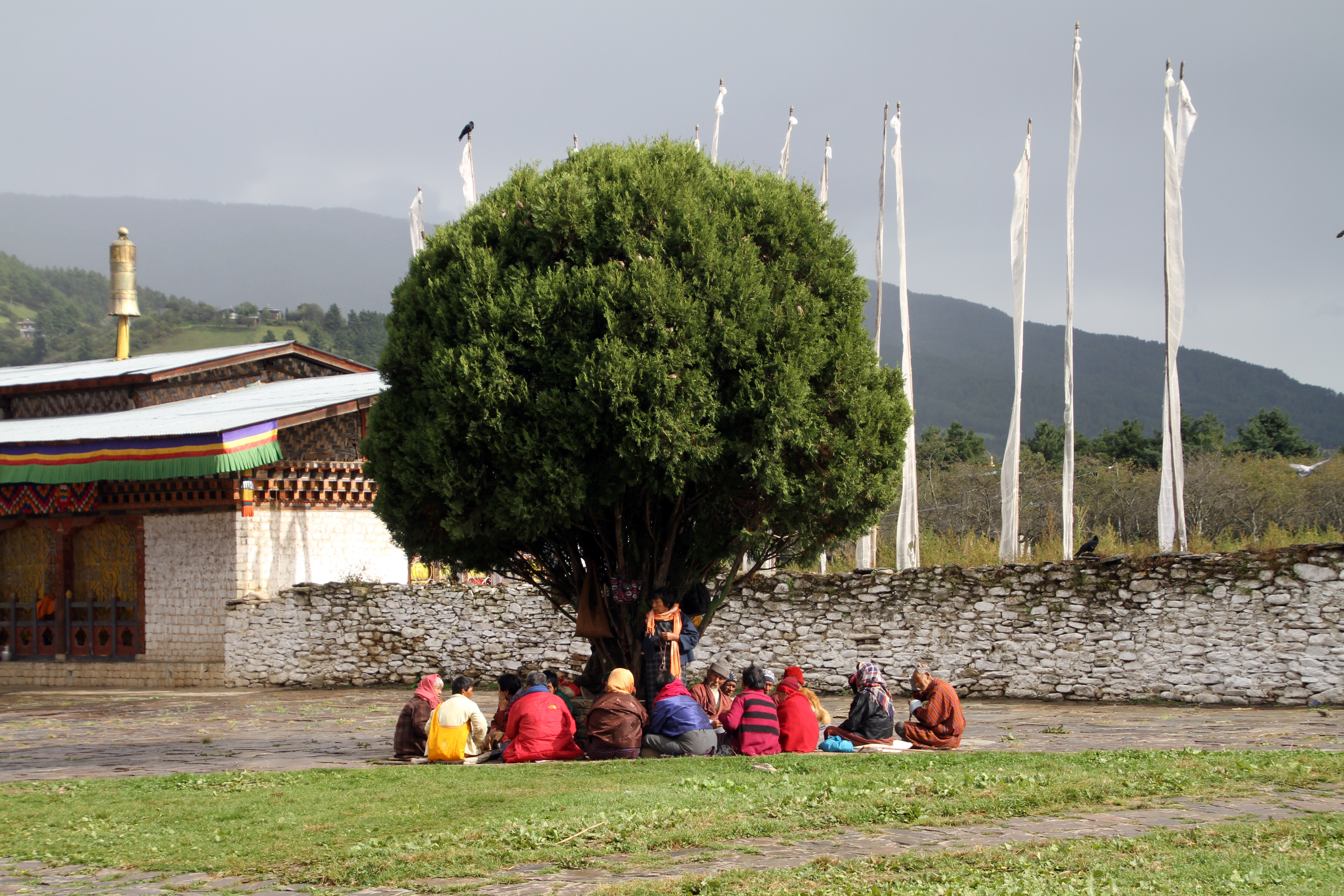

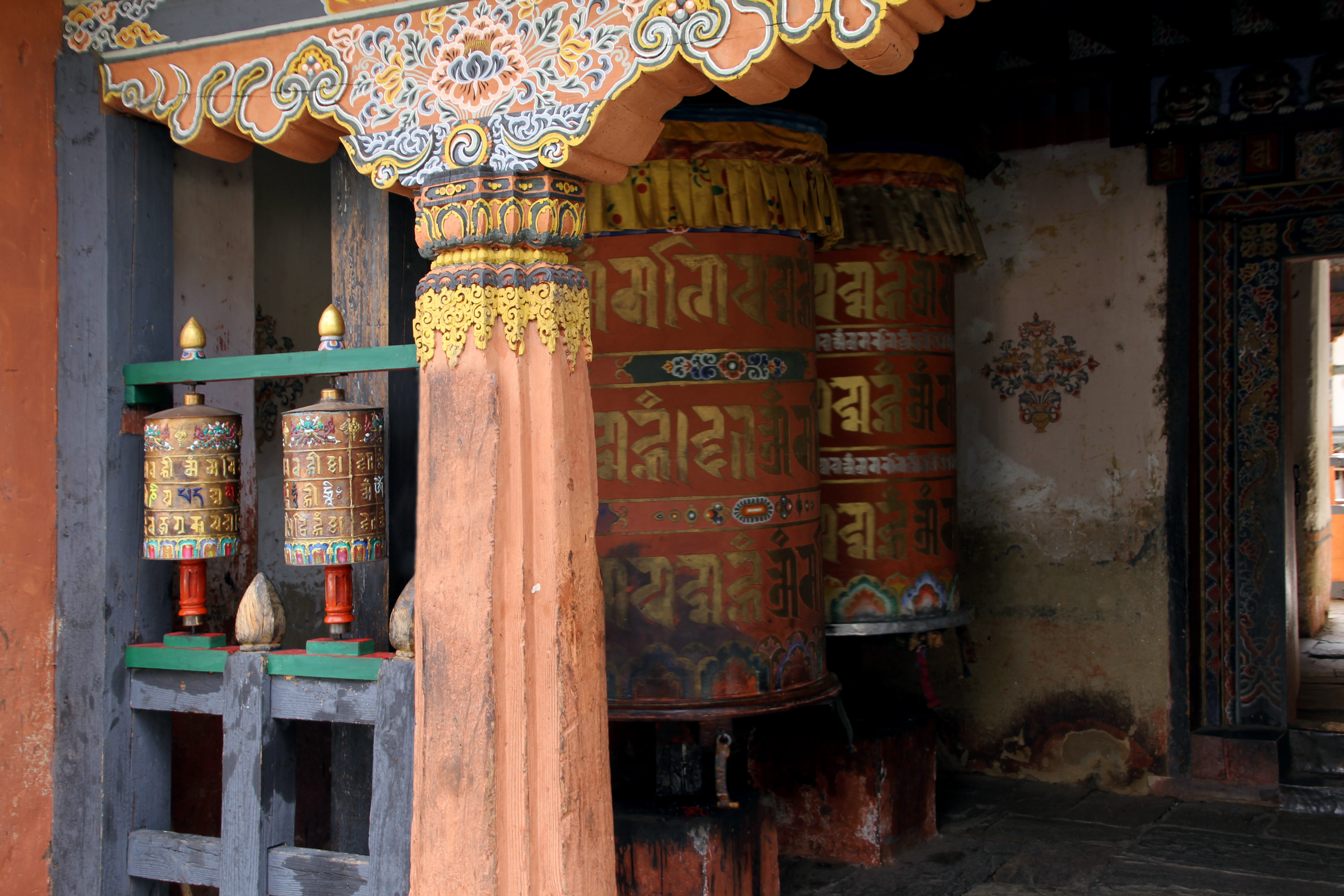

== Bibliography ==
- Pommaret, Francoise (2006). Bhutan Himalayan Mountains Kingdom (5th ed.). Odyssey Books and Guides.
