= Pema Lingpa =

Bhutanese Buddhist saint (1450–1521)

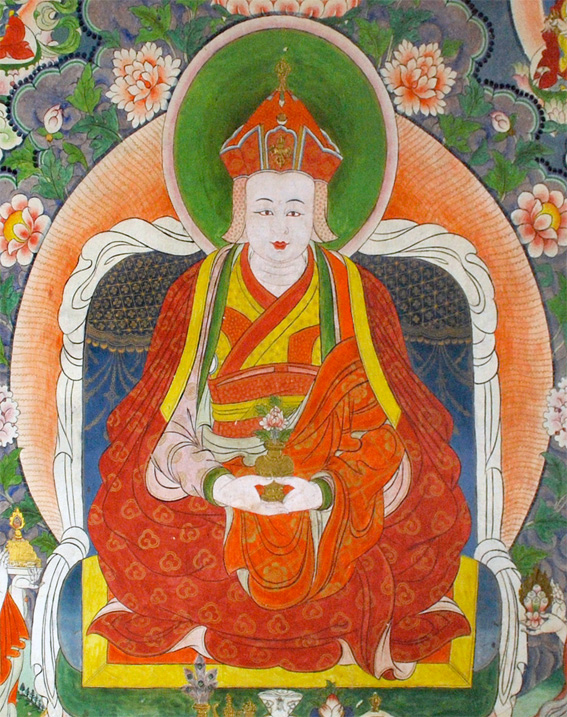
Thangka painting of Pema Lingpa

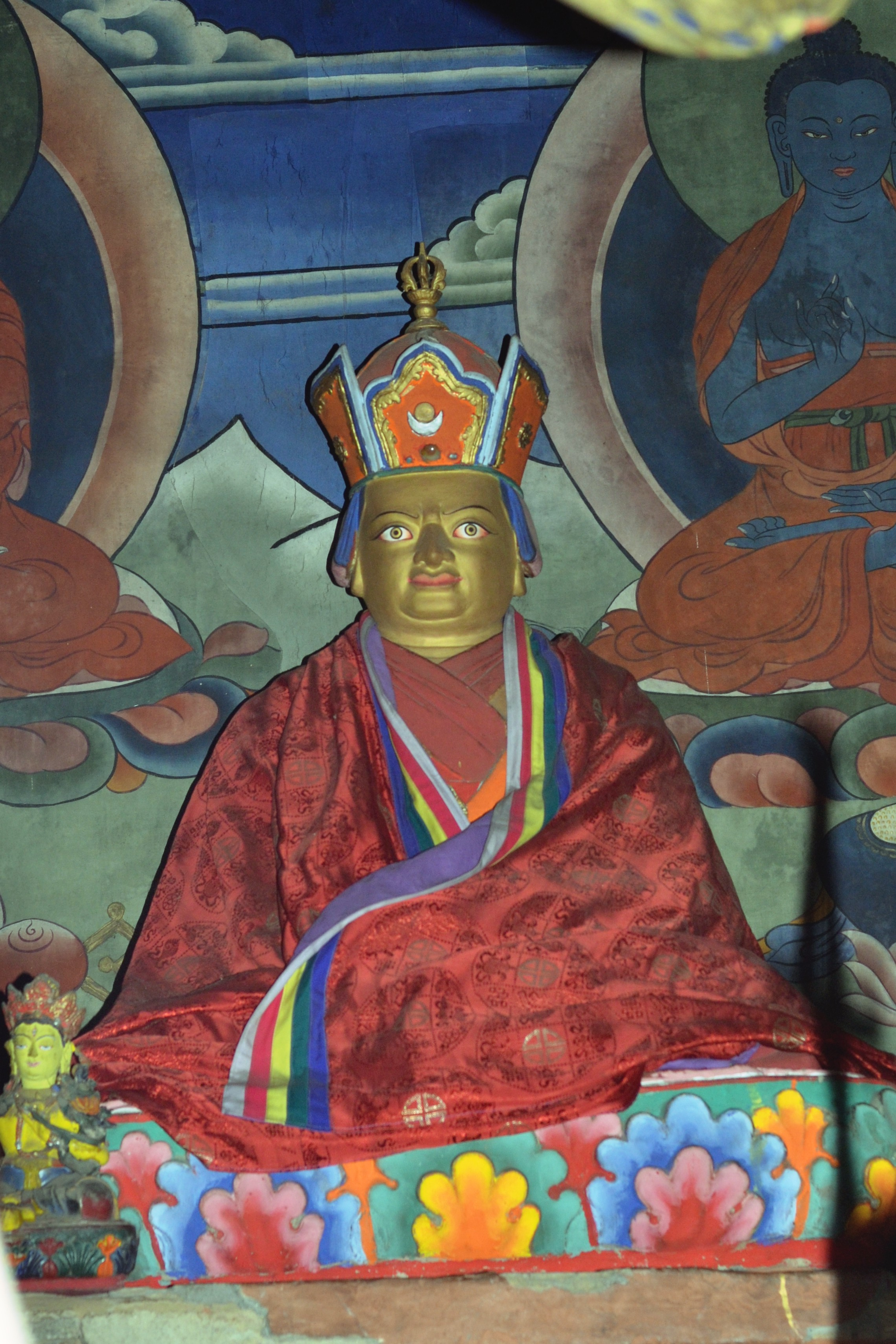
Statue of tertön Pema Lingpa in a temple in Tsakaling Gewog, Bhutan

Pema Lingpa or Padma Lingpa (Tibetan: པདྨ་གླིང་པ་, Wylie: pad ma gling pa, March or April 1450 – February 1521) was a Bhutanese saint and siddha of the Nyingma school of Tibetan Buddhism. He is considered a terchen or "preeminent tertön" (Wylie: gter chen, discoverer of spiritual treasures) and is considered to be foremost of the "Five Tertön Kings" (Wylie: gter ston rgyal po lnga). In the history of the Nyingma school in Bhutan, Pema Lingpa is second only in importance to Padmasambhava.

== Biography ==
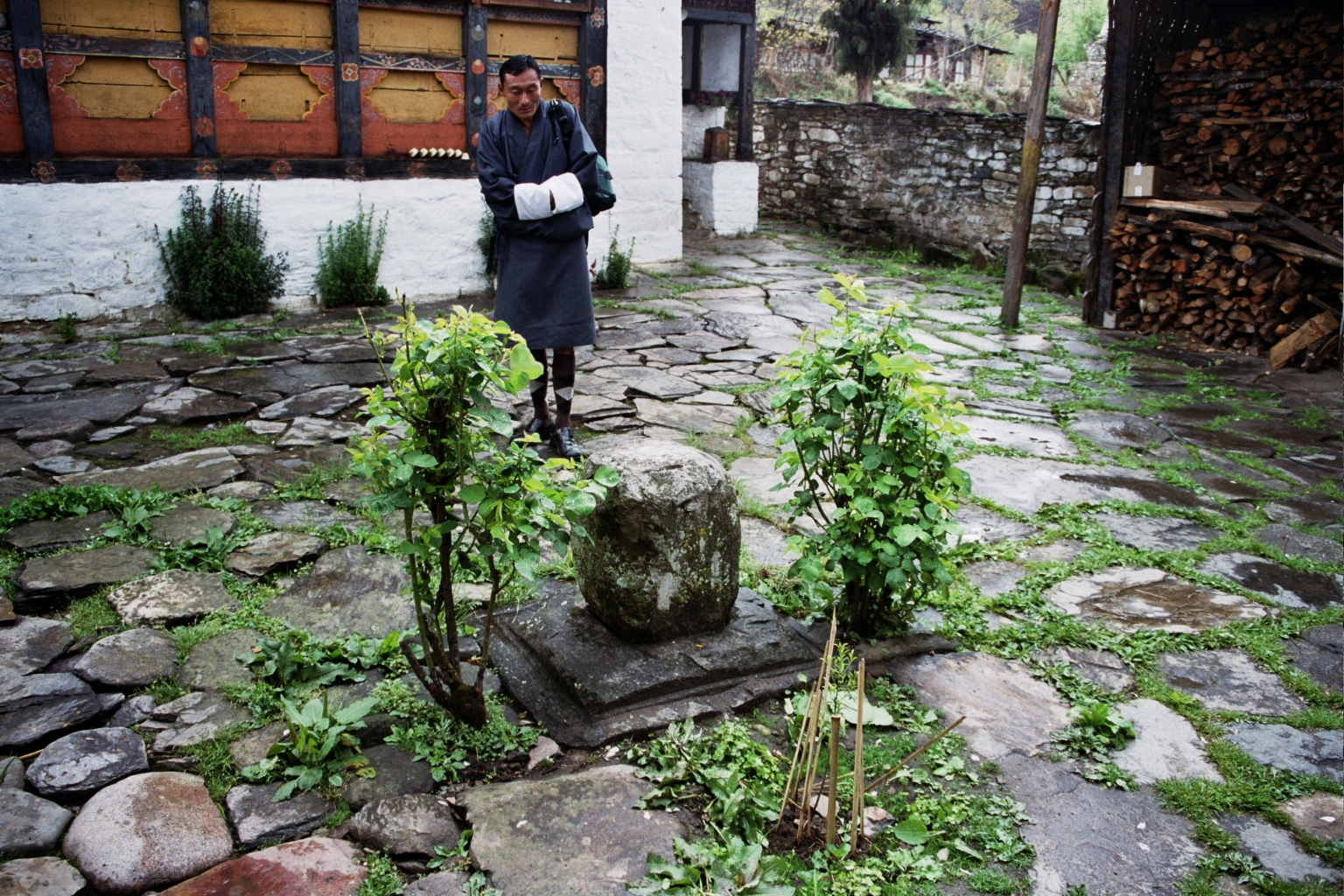
Courtyard of Könchogsum Lhakhang in Bumthang, where Pema Lingpa is said to have placed this stone plug over the subterranean lake below the temple

Pema Lingpa was born in March or April 1450 in Chel presently called Baribrang in Tang valley of Bumthang, part of the central Bhutanese region of Bumthang known as the “Wheel of Dharma.” His father was Lama Döndrup Zangpo of the Nyö clan, and his mother, Drogmo Pema Drolma, was bestowed with all the signs of a dakini. Their son was born among many miraculous signs. As an incarnation of the Omniscient One Drimé Ozer (Longchenpa), Pema Lingpa was extraordinary even as a child. He learned everything from reading and writing to ironwork and carpentry without receiving any instruction.

On the tenth day of the first month of autumn in a Monkey Year, Padmasambhava appeared before Pema Lingpa at the holy site of Yigé Drukma, blessed him, and placed in his hands an inventory of one hundred and eight major termas to be revealed. However, due to the karmic disposition of beings at that time, during his lifetime Pema Lingpa revealed only about half of the prophesied treasures. Nevertheless, the revealed treasures of Pema Lingpa contain the essence of all 108 treasures, which are summarized in the cycles of the three heart practices transmitted to Princess Pemasel by Guru Rinpoche: The Lama Jewel Ocean, The Union of Samantabhadra's Intentions, and The Great Compassionate One: The Lamp That Illuminates Darkness.

One well-known story of Pema Lingpa tells of his diving with a burning butter lamp into the Burning Lake in the Bumthang District of Bhutan. He told onlookers that if he was a false spirit his lamp would be extinguished. Disappearing into the bottom of the gorge and feared drowned, he emerged from the water with a statue the size of a fist and a treasure casket tucked under one arm, and the butter lamp still burning in the other.

Pema Lingpa was highly regarded by all four of the principal schools of Tibetan Buddhism. He spent his life revealing the precious treasures of Padmasambhava, giving empowerments and teachings, meditating in isolated locations, building and restoring monasteries, and establishing a tradition that endures to this day. He married twice. His first wife was Yum Tima (alias Sithar) and his second wife was Yum Bumdren.

Notable descendants of Pema Lingpa include the House of Wangchuck. The Pema Lingpa lineage of empowerments, transmissions and guidance continues today through the three lines of the Body, Speech, and Mind emanations of Pema Lingpa: the Gangteng, Sungtrul, and Tukse Rinpoches, all of whom traditionally reside in Bhutan.

== Death ==
When Tertön Pema Lingpa return to the Bumthang from Tibet in 1520, three Tsilung sculptures and the Tongwa Kundol sculptures were said to have weeped showing the bad omens. He entered into parinirvana at the age of seventy-one in February 1521, on the third day of the first month of the Iron Snake Year in the Bhutanese calendar. He died holding the hand of his heart son, Dawa Gyeltsen witnessed by many other devoted disciples. His body was left untouched for nine days, yet it showed no signs of decomposing. He was then cremated and the remains were placed in a reliquary stupa at Tamzhing Lhundrub Choling.

== Emanation lineages ==
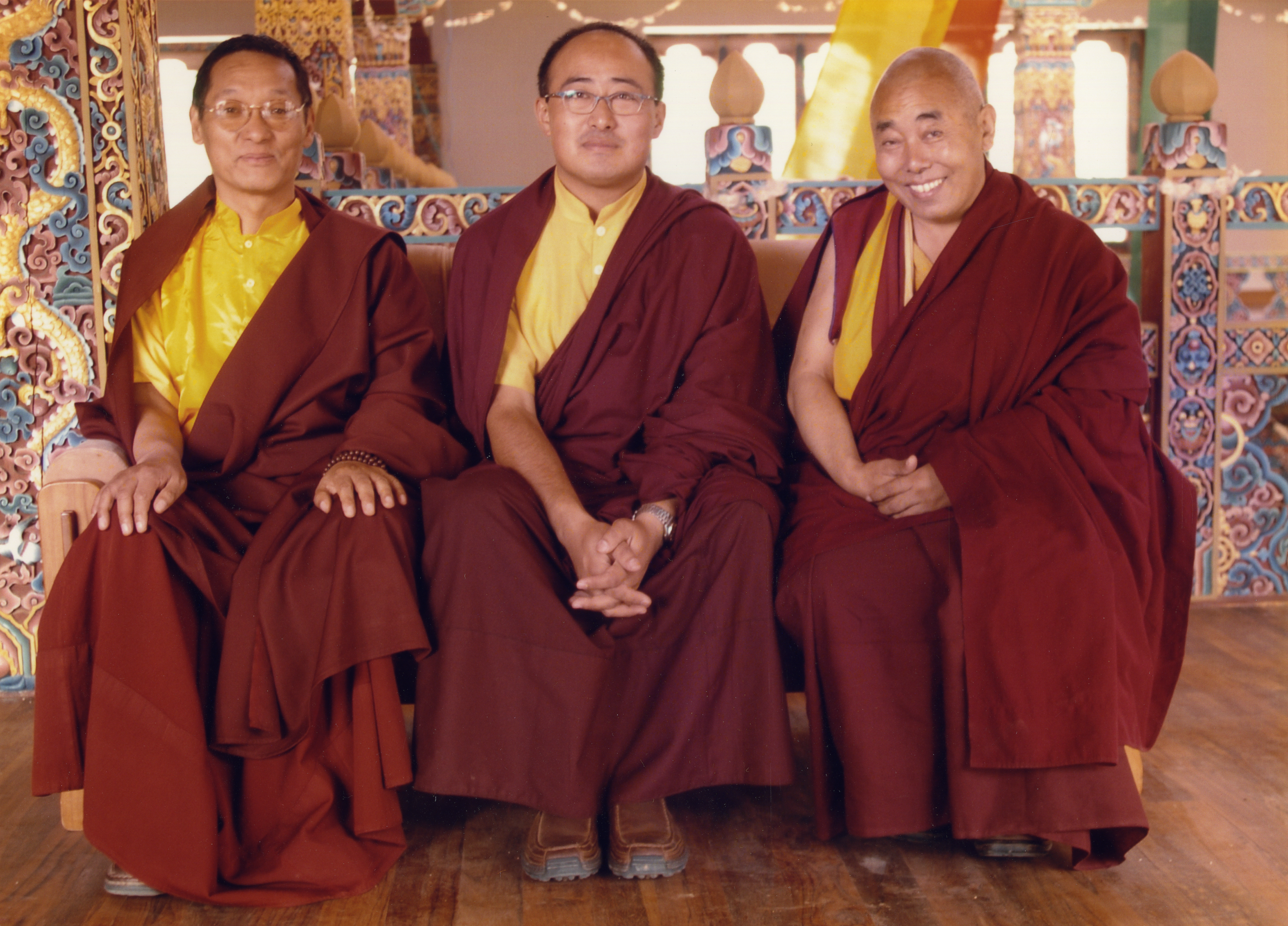
Pema Lingpa incarnations

Traditionally, there are three main emanation lineages of Padma Lingpa recognized:

1. the Peling Sungtrul incarnations: The incarnation of Padma Lingpa
2. the Peling Thuksay incarnations: The incarnations of Padma Lingpa's son Thuksay Dawa Gyeltshen
3. the Gangteng Truelku or Peling Gyalse incarnations: The incarnations of Gyalse Pema Thinley; son of Thuksay Dawa Gyeltshen.

They are known as "Peling Yab-sey-sum" meaning incarnations of Father, son and grandson, who are considered to be the combined body and activity incarnations. However mistakenly many refer to three of them as incarnations of speech, mind and body.

=== Peling Sungtrul incarnations ===
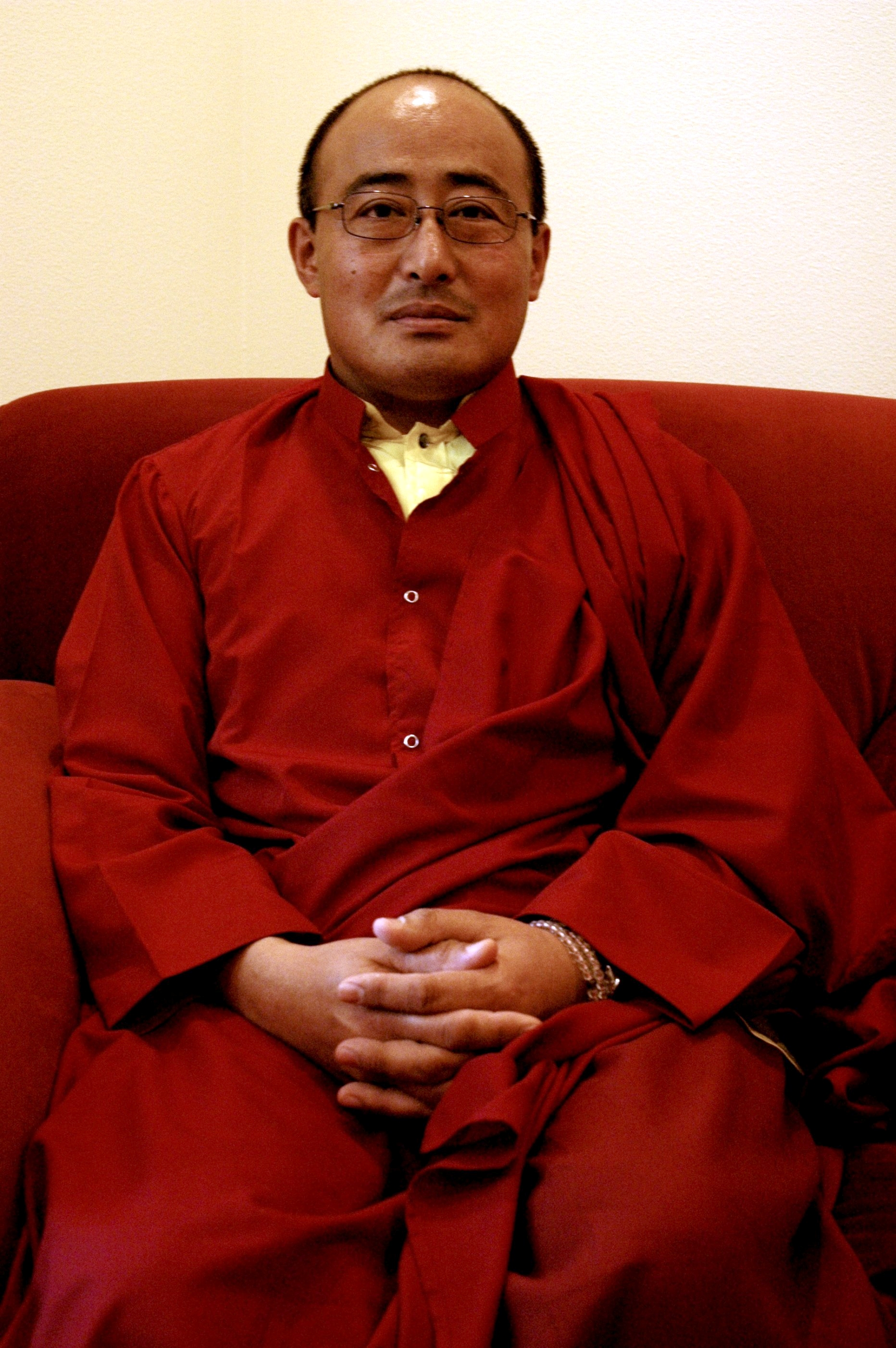
Lhalung Sungtrul Rinpoche

The incarnations are:

- Tenzin Drakpa བསྟན་འཛིན་གྲགས་པ (1536–1597)
- Kunkhyen Tsultim Dorje ཀུན་མཁྱེན་ཚུལ་ཁྲིམས་རྡོ་རྗེ (1680–1723)
- Dorje Mikyō-tsal རྡོ་རྗེ་མི་སྐྱོད་རྩལ a.k.a. Ngawang Kunzang Rolpai Dorje ངག་དབང་ཀུན་བཟང་རོལ་པའི་རྡོ་རྗེ (1725–1762)
- Kunzang Tsewang ཀུན་བཟང་ཚེ་དབང a.k.a. Tenzin Drubchog Dorje བསྟན་འཛིན་གྲུབ་མཆོག་རྡོ་རྗེ (1763–1817)
- Kunzang Tenpai Gyaltsen ཀུན་བཟང་བསྟན་པའི་རྒྱལ་མཚན (1819–1842)
- Pema Tenzin པདྨ་བསྟན་འཛིན a.k.a. Kunzang Ngawang Chokyi Lodro ཀུན་བཟང་ངག་དབང་ཆོས་ཀྱི་བློ་གྲོས ()
- Kunzang Dechen Dorje ཀུན་བཟང་བདེ་ཆེན་རྡོ་རྗེ
- Tenzin Chōki Gyaltsen བསྟན་འཛིན་ཆོས་ཀྱི་རྒྱལ་མཚན (1843–1891)
- Pema Ōsal Gyurme Dorje པདྨ་འོད་གསལ་འགྱུར་མེད་རྡོ་རྗེ (1930–1955)
- Jigdrel Kunzang Pema Dorji ཀུན་བཟང་པདྨ་རིན་ཆེན་རྣམ་རྒྱལ (b. 1965) – the present Peling Sungtrul or Lhalung Sungtrul Rinpoche

=== Peling Tukse incarnations ===
The incarnations are:

- Tukse Dawa Gyaltsen ཐུགས་སྲས་ཟླ་བ་རྒྱལ་མཚན (b. 1499) – son of Pema Lingpa
- Nyida Gyaltsen ཉི་ཟླ་རྒྱལ་མཚན
- Nyida Longyang ཉི་ཟླ་རྒྱལ་མཚན
- Tenzin Gyurme Dorje བསྟན་འཛིན་འགྱུར་མེད་རྡོ་རྗེ (1641 – ca. 1702)
- Gyurme Chogdrub Palzang འགྱུར་མེད་མཆོག་གྲུབ་དཔལ་འབར་བཟང་པོ (ca. 1708–1750)
- Tenzin Chokyi Nyima བསྟན་འཛིན་ཆོས་ཀྱི་ཉི་མ (ca. 1752–1775)
- Kunzang Gyurme Dorje Lungrig Chokyi Gocha ཀུན་བཟང་འགྱུར་མེད་རྡོ་རྗེ་ལུང་རིགས་ཆོས་ཀྱི་གོ་ཆ (ca. 1780 – ca. 1825)
- Kunzang Zilnon Zhadpa-tsal ཀུན་བཟང་ཟིལ་གནོན་བཞད་པ་རྩལ
- Thubten Palwar ཐུབ་བསྟན་དཔལ་འབར (1906–1939)
- Tegchog Tenpa'i Gyaltsen ཐེག་མཆོག་བསྟན་པའི་རྒྱལ་མཚན (1951–2010)

=== Peling Gyalse (Gangteng Tulku) incarnations ===
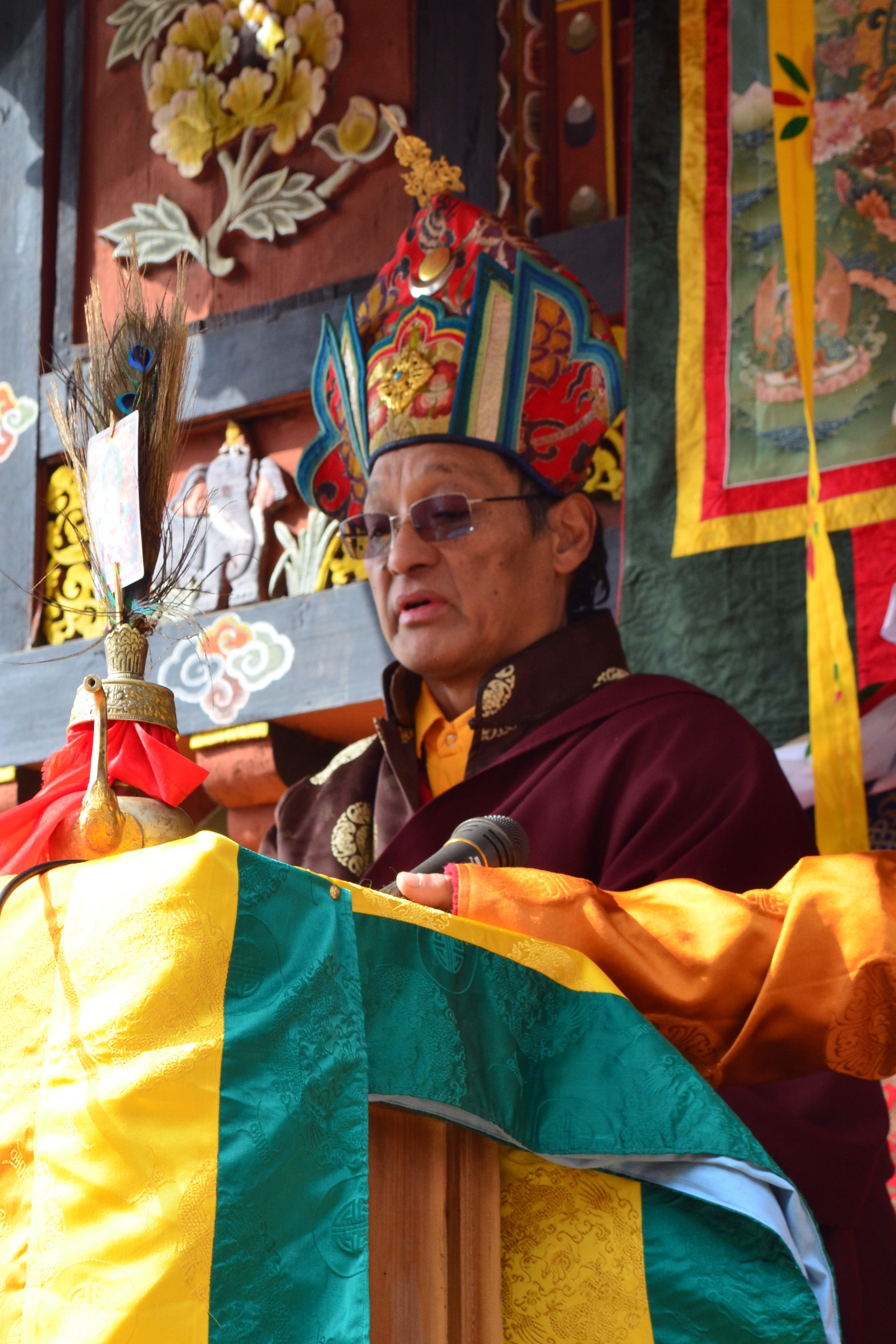
Gangteng Tulku Rinpoche

The incarnations are:

- Gyalse Pema Tinley རྒྱལ་སྲས་པདྨ་འཕྲིན་ལས (1564–1642)
- Tenzin Lekpai Dondrup བསྟན་འཛིན་ལེགས་པའི་དོན་གྲུབ (1645–1726)
- Tinley Namgyal འཕྲིན་ལས་རྣམ་རྒྱལ a.k.a. Kunzang Pema Namgyal (d. ca. 1750)
- Tenzin Sizhi Namgyal བསྟན་འཛིན་སྲིད་ཞི་རྣམ་རྒྱལ (1761? –1796)
- Orgyen Geleg Namgyal ཨོ་རྒྱན་དགེ་ལེགས་རྣམ་རྒྱལ (d. 1842?)
- Orgyen Tenpai Nyima ཨོ་རྒྱན་བསྟན་པའི་ཉི་མ (1873–1900?)
- Orgyen Tenpai Nyinjed ཨོ་རྒྱན་བསྟན་པའི་ཉིན་བྱེད
- Orgyen Thinley Dorje ཨོ་རྒྱན་འཕྲིན་ལས་རྡོ་རྗེ
- Rigdzing Kunzang Padma Namgyal རིག་འཛིན་ཀུན་བཟང་པདྨ་རྣམ་རྒྱལ (b. 1955) – the present Gangteng Tulku Rinpoche

== Family lineages ==
Pema Lingpa's family line grew into a pre-eminent class of religious elites, known as Choje, who were pre-dominant in the Bhutanese religious and political sphere. The House of Wangchuck claims direct descent from Pema Lingpa, as do many other Himalayan religious elites.

=== Tamzhing Chöje ===
This Chöje family, with its main seat at Tamzhing Monastery, began with Pema Lingpa's son, Drakpa Gyalpo, who died without leaving an heir. The family line continued through Pema Lingpa's youngest son, Sangda.
