= Taklung =

Taklung ताक्लुङ
- Village development committee
- Location in Nepal Taklung (Nepal)
- Coordinates: 27.91°N 84.63°E
- Country: Nepal
- Zone: Gandaki Zone
- District: Gorkha District

Population (1991)
  - Total: 4,835
- Time zone: UTC+5:45 (Nepal Time)

Taklung is a village development committee in Gorkha District in the Gandaki Zone of northern-central Nepal. At the time of the 1991 Nepal census it had a population of 4,835 and had 859 houses in the town.
