= Karma Phuntsok Namgyal =

5th Tsangpa Tibetan ruler (1587–1620)

Karma Phuntsok Namgyal (Tibetan: ཀར་མ་ཕུན་ཚོགས་རྣམ་རྒྱལ་, Wylie: Kar-ma Phun-tshogs Rnam-rgyal;) (1587 – March 1620) was a king of Tibet who ruled from 1618 to 1620. He belonged to the Tsangpa dynasty that held power in Tsang (West Central Tibet) since 1565 and was the foremost political and military power in Tibet until 1642.

== Family ==
The family background of Karma Phuntsok Namgyal is somewhat unclear. According to a religious biography, he was the son of Karma Thutob Namgyal, ruler of Upper Tsang, and a lady from Yargyab. Other sources make him the son of either of the rulers Karma Tseten or Karma Tensung. The law code issued by his son Karma Tenkyong vaguely says that Karma Thutob Namgyal and his brothers had Karma Phuntsok Namgyal as their son, suggesting the Tibetan practice of polyandry. The same text asserts that he was 25 years old in 1611, which in the Tibetan system would indicate 1587 as his year of birth. According to some texts his predecessor Karma Tensung died in the iron-pig year 1611. However, another source mentions Karma Phuntsok Namgyal as a Tsangpa leader by 1603. As such he would have directed the military attack into Ü (East Central Tibet) in 1605. According to still another text his first major feat was an incident in 1607 when he led his troops in an attack that dispersed a Mongol force that had been called in by the lord of Kyishö near Lhasa. At his accession he held control over the bulk of Tsang, Toh in western Tibet, and some parts of Ü. In 1612–13 he led an expedition to Ngari (West Tibet), where Mangyül Gungthang was subjugated. Latö Lho and Latö Chang (in western Tsang) suffered the same fate. The agility of Karma Phuntsok Namgyal was demonstrated by his swift turn from the western campaign to invade Ü in the east in 1613. The troops from Tsang resolutely worsted the Phagmodrupa king Mipham Wanggyur Gyalpo who created trouble in the Yarlung Valley. After these feats the writ of the king of Tsang ran all the way from Latö and Nyangtö in the west to Ü in the east. Among the new acquisitions were Lopa (south of Ü), Dagpo (in the far south-east), Phanyul (to the north of Lhasa), and Neu (south-east of Lhasa). The new dependencies were nevertheless far from secured, and he had to take up arms from time to time.

== Fighting the Gelugpa ==
Like his predecessors, Karma Phuntsok Namgyal was a staunch supporter of the Karmapa sect of Buddhism. That made him oppose the authority of the Gelugpa sect, headed by the Fourth Dalai Lama Yonten Gyatso (1589–1616) and the Fourth Panchen Lama Lobsang Chökyi Gyaltsen (1570–1662). After a tour in southern Tibet, Karma Phuntsok Namgyal arrived at Lhasa and sent his secretary to ask the Dalai Lama for a religious audience. However, the entourage of Yonten Gyatso declined the request on the pretext that their spiritual lord was in deep meditation and could not be disturbed. Karma Phuntsok Namgyal was deeply offended. In December 1614, he gathered all the governors and religious hierarchs in Tsang for a meeting at Samdrubtse (Shigatse). He pushed the participants into it by accepting the head of the Black Hat line of the Karmapa, Choying Dorje (1604–74), as the desi (ruler). This step strengthened Tsangpa authority since real power was in their hands. Two years later, the Dalai Lama died.

== Relation to Ngawang Namgyal and Bhutan ==
Meanwhile, a fateful conflict flared up with Ngawang Namgyal (1594–1651?), a grandson of the prince-abbot of the Ralung monastery. This person was considered to be the main reincarnation of the well-known religious Drukpa scholar Kunkhyen Pema Karpo (1527–92). However, Karma Phuntsok Namgyal refused to acknowledge the claim, which had to do with an internal Drukpa dispute. Ngawang Namgyal's recognition and enthronement at Ralung as the Gyalwang Drukpa incarnation was, namely, opposed by Lhatsewa Ngawang Zangpo, an influential follower of Drukpa Pema Karpo. He instead promoted the recognition of a rival candidate as the right incarnation. This was Pagsam Wangpo who was an illegitimate son of the Chongje Depa, Ngawang Sonam Drakpa. Lhatsewa and the supporters of the Chongje Depa conducted an enthronement ceremony of Pagsam Wangpo at the Tashi Thongmen monastery, where he was thus appointed as the new Gyalwang Drukpa and the putative incarnation of Kunkhyen Pema Karpo. The Chongje Depa then persuaded the Tsang Desi (or Depa Tsangpa), being the patron of the rival Karma Kagyu sect, to support the recognition of Pagsam Wangpo. By 1612 Karma Phuntsok Namgyal had become the major political force in Central Tibet (Ü and Tsang) and his words carried great weight. A meeting between the king and Ngawang Namgyal was arranged in the Tsang capital Shigatse in 1614, but the cleric held a disrespectful attitude, and the conversations with the king led to nothing. On Ngawang Namgyal's return to Ralung an incident occurred where his men had a fight with a Karmapa lama and his followers, whereby some people were drowned. Karma Phuntsok Namgyal resolved to have Ngawang Namgyal killed, but the latter fled to Bhutan in 1616. There he built up a position of authority. After some time the Tsangpa king sent a force under Lagunas to invade Bhutan. The expedition captured Padro but was subsequently defeated by Ngawang Namgyal's followers, and Lagunas was killed.

== Conquest of Central Tibet ==
In Central Tibet itself the religious disputes were soon resumed. Karma Phuntsok Namgyal ordered the construction of a Karmapa monastery at Shigatse, provocatively called Tashi Zilnon, 'the suppressor of Tashilhunpo'. The name alluded to the nearby Gelugpa monastery Tashilhunpo which was harassed in various ways. In 1618, before a new reincarnation of the Dalai Lama had been found, a host of Chokhur Mongols who had come to Ü on pilgrimage raided cattle belonging to the Tsangpa. Karma Phuntsok Namgyal invaded Ü in retaliation. At first the Mongol and Ü forces were successful, but in the end the Tsangpa troops were completely victorious. Monks from Drepung and Sera tried to resist but suffered great losses. Several Gelugpa monasteries in Ü were forced to convert to the Karmapa brand of Buddhism. The Kyishö estates were subdued and the secular lord had to leave for Tsokha The victorious Tsangpa ruler became known as cakravartin, world ruler, 'by virtue of his strength.' The Karmapa leader Choying Dorje appointed him ruler of Ü and Tsang and bestowed a seal on him. By this time he may be termed king of Tibet, although he was never able to overcome his enemies completely. After his victory he repaired the temples that had been destroyed during the fighting and made offerings to the sacred Jowo statue in the Jokhang temple. He also resumed the expansion in western Tibet, where the Mangyül Gungthang kingdom was definitely incorporated in 1619. The Panchen Lama, although an enemy of the dynasty, was supposedly invited to treat Karma Phuntsok Namgyal from an illness which his ordinary physicians were unable to remedy. As a reward the ruler lifted the ban to search for the reincarnation of Yonten Gyatso. The boy was eventually found in 1619 and installed as Ngawang Lobsang Gyatso, the Fifth Dalai Lama (1617–82). Shortly after this, Karma Phuntsok Namgyal died. According to one account his enemy Ngawang Namgyal of Bhutan cast a tantric spell over him, which caused the demise of him and his two wives from smallpox. His demise took place shortly after 22 March in the iron-bird year 1620; however, the literature also mentions the dates 1621, 1623, 1631 or 1632. He was succeeded by his son Karma Tenkyong, the last king of the Tsangpa dynasty.

Preceded by Karma Tensung	Ruler of Tsang; 1611–1620	Succeeded by Karma Tenkyong
Preceded by various local regimes	Ruler of Tibet; 1618–1620	Succeeded by Karma Tenkyong
