= Tsangpa =

Tibetan dynasty (1565–1642)

Tsangpa གཙང་པ
- 1565–1642
- Capital: Shigatse
- Common languages: Tibetan
- Religion: Tibetan Buddhism
- Government: Buddhist theocracy
- Monarch
  - 1565–1599: Karma Tseten (first)
  - 1599–1611: Karma Tensung
  - 1620–1642: Karma Tenkyong (last)
- History
  - Established: 1565
  - Disestablished: 1642
Preceded by	Succeeded by
Phagmodrupa dynasty; Rinpungpa	Khoshut Khanate; Ganden Phodrang
- Today part of: China

Tsangpa (Tibetan: གཙང་པ, Wylie: gTsang pa) was a dynasty that dominated large parts of Tibet from 1565 to 1642. It was the last Tibetan royal dynasty to rule in their own name. The regime was founded by Karma Tseten, a low-born retainer of the prince of the Rinpungpa dynasty and governor of Samdrubtsé (also called Shigatse) in Tsang (West-Central Tibet) since 1548.

== Superseding the Rinpungpa ==
During the 16th century Tibet was fragmented among rivaling factions along religious as well as dynastic lines. The Phagmodrupa dynasty lost any semblance of power after 1564 and its rival Rinpungpa was also unable to achieve unity. Among the traditions of Tibetan Buddhism, the Karma Kagyu school competed against the Gelug, which was headed by the Dalai Lama. According to tradition, Karma Tseten obtained a troop of horsemen by altering a document issued by his master, the Rinpungpa lord. He then raised the standard of rebellion in 1557 and managed to supersede the Rinpungpa by a surprise attack in 1565. This was facilitated by the simmering discontent with the Rinpungpa among several vassals. Known as the Depa Tsangpa or Tsang Desi, he became the king of Upper Tsang and allied with Köncho Yenlak, the 5th Shamarpa of the Karma Kagyu. Wangchuk Dorje, 9th Karmapa Lama, met him on several occasions and transferred tutelary deities to the ruler. This was a ritually important act to legitimize the new regime. Karma Tseten also patronized the Nyingma, Sakya and Jonang sects.

The rise of the dynasty should be seen against the backdrop of anxiety about outside intervention in the deeply divided country. The alliance between the 3rd Dalai Lama and the Tumed leader Altan Khan (1578) likely aroused the fear of some aristocratic families in Ü-Tsang and of the non-Gelug schools. This motivated the Karmapa to seek protection from the Tsangpa rulers. The new dynasty strove to keep Tibet free from the recurring Mongol incursions which plagued the land on several occasions in the late 16th and early 17th century. The further aim was to revive the glories of the old Tibetan Empire and create a peaceful and well-ordered Tsang. This was partly successful; the last remains of Rinpungpa authority vanished in 1590 as they were forced to capitulate their heartland Rong to Karma Tseten. There is nothing to suggest that the regime kept any relations with the declining Ming dynasty of China.

== Struggle against the Gelugpa ==
Our sources from this period are mainly concerned with religious affairs and do not disclose much about the administrative structure of the Tsangpa realm. The basis of their power is therefore still insufficiently understood. Nor is the history of Karma Tseten's closest successors well known, but in the early 17th century the dynasty is frequently mentioned as a competitor for power over Tibet. The family was generally opposed to the Gelugpa and Dalai Lamas, whose power meanwhile increased in Ü. The Tsangpa ruler Karma Tensung (or, in another account, his nephew Karma Phuntsok Namgyal) reacted by invading Ü from his base in Tsang in 1605 and attacking the Drepung and Sera Monasteries. 5,000 monks are said to have been massacred on this occasion. The Tsangpa army expelled the Mongol troops that assisted the 4th Dalai Lama, himself a Mongol prince by birth. The Dalai Lama had to flee and the Tsangpa ruler was close to becoming the king of Tibet.

In 1612 and 1613, the Tsangpa ruler subjugated a number of local regimes in West Tibet: the Ngari Gyelpo, Lhopa and Changpa. There were also spectacular successes in the east. The new acquisitions included Dagpo in the far southeast, Phanyul (north of Lhasa) and Neu (southeast of Lhasa). He was less successful against Bhutan, where his enemy, Ngawang Namgyal, the prince-abbot of Ralung Monastery and the 4th incarnation of Kuenkhyen Padma Karpo (Founder of the Drukpa Kagyu Sect in Tsang) had taken refuge. The Tsang Desi had politically backed the other incarnation Passam Wangpo Gyalwang Drukpa, forcing Ngawang Namgyal to flee to Bhutan and establish his regency there.

== Expansion and Mongol response ==
In 1618, the Tsangpa Gyelpo pushed further into Ü and defeated the local leaders of Kyishö and Tsal. By now, Karma Phuntsok Namgyal was virtually the ruler of Central Tibet and was consecrated as such by Chöying Dorje, 10th Karmapa. In the following year 1619, the West Tibetan kingdom of Mangyül Gungthang was conquered. In the next year again Karma Phuntsok Namgyal returned to Ü in order to eliminate the last possible obstacle to his authority. Nêdong, the seat of the impotent Phagmodrupa dynasty, was besieged and forced to yield to his power. Tsang forces occupied the entire Yarlung Valley.

The hegemony of Tsangpa was, however, only of a brief nature – their position as an upstart family without aristocratic roots made their authority tenuous. After Yonten Gyatso's death, his successor, the 5th Dalai Lama (1617–1682), received help from the Mongols, who pushed into Ü in 1621. The new Tsangpa king Karma Tenkyong was defeated and besieged at Chakpori Hill by Lhasa, and his army only escaped annihilation through the intervention of the Panchen Lama. An agreement was made whereby the Gelugpa regained much of their former authority in Ü. The abbot of the important Drigung Monastery in Ü, allied to the Tsangpa, was abducted by the Tumed Mongols in 1623, which was a further blow. In retaliation, Karma Tenkyong brought his troops to Ü and occupied the Lhasa region. The following years saw a lull in the fighting while both sides tried to attract allies. Karma Tenkyong sought the assistance of the Choghtu Mongols, and a troop under prince Arsalan invaded Tibet in 1635 in order to attack the Gelugpa positions. However, in the end Arsalan declined to actually support the Tsangpa, leading to an entirely unsatisfactory conclusion of the enterprise for Karma Tenkyong and the Karmapa and Shamarpa hierarchs. At the same time, Karma Tenkyong was threatened by Ladakh in the west, although it never came to open warfare.

== Triumph of the Dalai Lama ==
In 1641, the leader of the Khoshut Mongols of the Kokonor region, Güshi Khan, set out from his home area and attacked the king of Beri in Kham, who was a practitioner of the Bon religion and persecuted Buddhist lamas. Güshi Khan had been in contact with "the Great Fifth" since 1637 and was a major champion for his cause. After having defeated Beri, he proceeded to invade Tsang. Justification for this was found in the alliance between Beri and Tsang, which allegedly aimed at eradicating the Gelugpa. The Dalai Lama was opposed to a Mongol invasion which would have devastating effects on Central Tibet, but was not able to change the course of events. Güshi Khan's reputation as an invincible commander rendered resistance weak. The Tsangpa stronghold, Shigatse, was captured after a long and bloody siege in March 1642. Karma Tenkyong was taken prisoner with his foremost ministers and kept in custody in Neu near Lhasa. After a revolt by Tsangpa supporters in the same year, the incensed Güshi Khan ordered Karma Tenkyong placed in an oxhide bag and drowned in a river. Güshi Khan, who founded the Khoshut Khanate, presented Ü, Tsang and part of East Tibet to the Dalai Lama to rule. In that way began the religious Ganden Phodrang regime that lasted until 1950.

== List of rulers ==
- Karma Tseten 1565–1599
- Khunpang Lhawang Dorje c. 1582–1605/06 (son)
- Karma Thutob Namgyal c. 1586–1610 (brother)
- Karma Tensung 1599–1611 (brother)
- Karma Phuntsok Namgyal 1611–1620 (son of Karma Thutob Namgyal)
- Karma Tenkyong 1620–1642 (son)

== See also ==
- History of Tibet
- List of rulers of Tibet
- Sino-Tibetan relations during the Ming dynasty

== Literature ==
- K.-H. Everding (2000), Das Königreich Mangyul Gungthang, Vol. I-II. Bonn.
- J. Gentry (2013), Substance and Sense: Objects of Power in the Life, Writings, and Legacy of the Tibetan Ritual Master Sog bzlog pa Blo gros rgyal mtshan, PhD Thesis, Harvard University.
- H. Hoffmann (1986), Tibet. A Handbook, Bloomington.
- T. W. D. Shakabpa (1967), Tibet. A Political History, New Haven.
- G. Tucci (1949), Tibetan Painted Scrolls, 2 Vols. Rome.
- https://studybuddhism.com/web/en/archives/e-books/unpublished_manuscripts/survey_tibetan_history/chapter_4.html
- http://www.tibetinfor.com/tibetzt/tsjb/doc/606.htm (in Chinese)
