= Könchogsum Lhakhang =

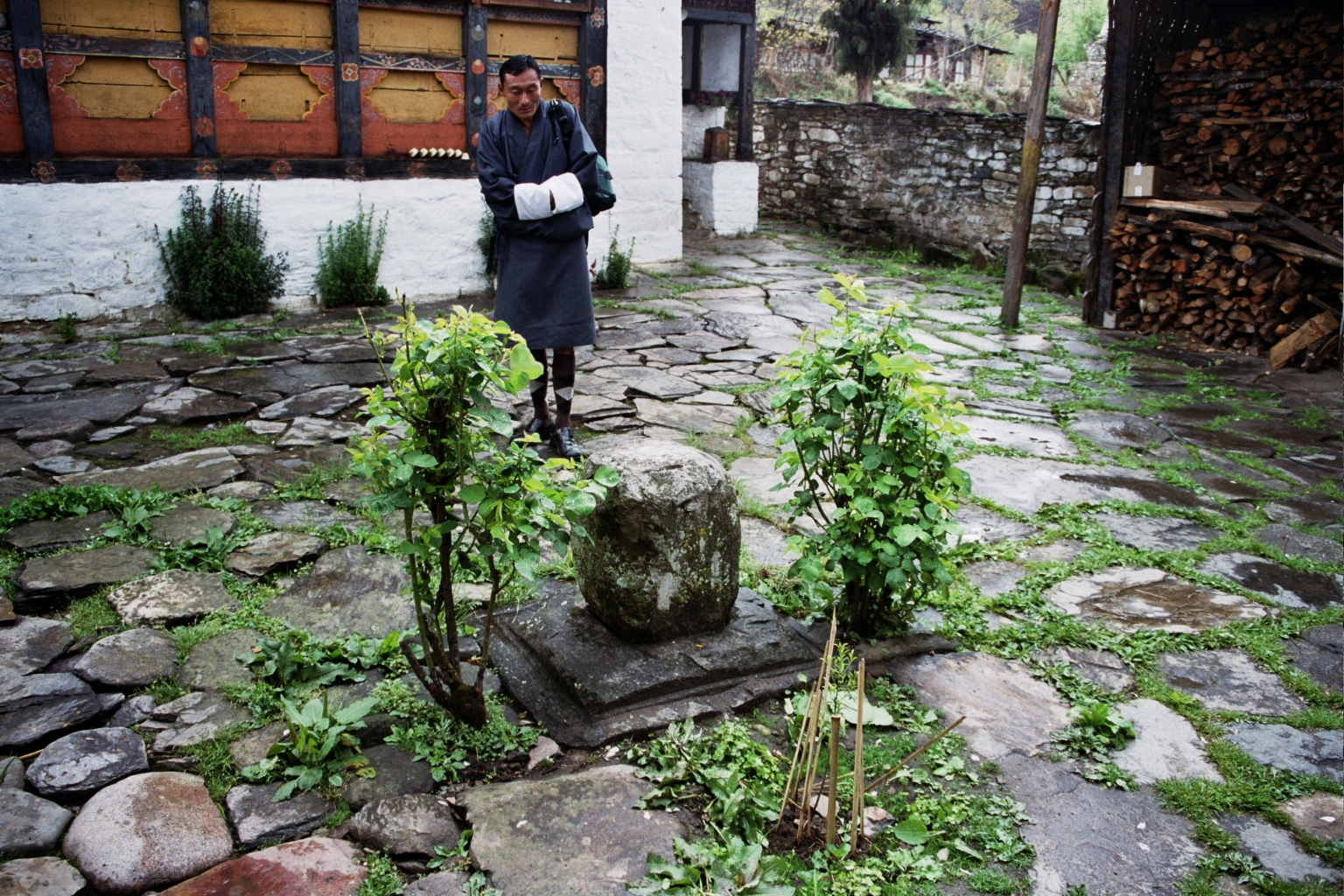
- Courtyard of Konchogsum Lhakhang

- Location within Bhutan

Religion
- Affiliation: Tibetan Buddhism

Location
- Location: Bumthang
- Country: Bhutan
- Interactive map of Könchogsum Lhakhang
- Coordinates: 27°35′07″N 90°44′21″E

Architecture
- Established: 8th century

Könchogsum Lhakhang, also known as Tsilung, is a Buddhist monastery in central Bhutan.

== History ==
According to Pema Lingpa, the temple was founded as far back as the 8th century.

In February 2010, Könchogsum Lhakhang was severely damaged by fire and has since been rebuilt. The new temple and monastery was consecrated in November 2014.

== Architecture ==
The temple contains a statue of Vairocana in its main sanctuary and statues of Padmasambhava, Avalokiteśvara, and paintings of Pema Lingpa and Longchenpa.
