= Simtokha Dzong =

Dzong in Bhutan

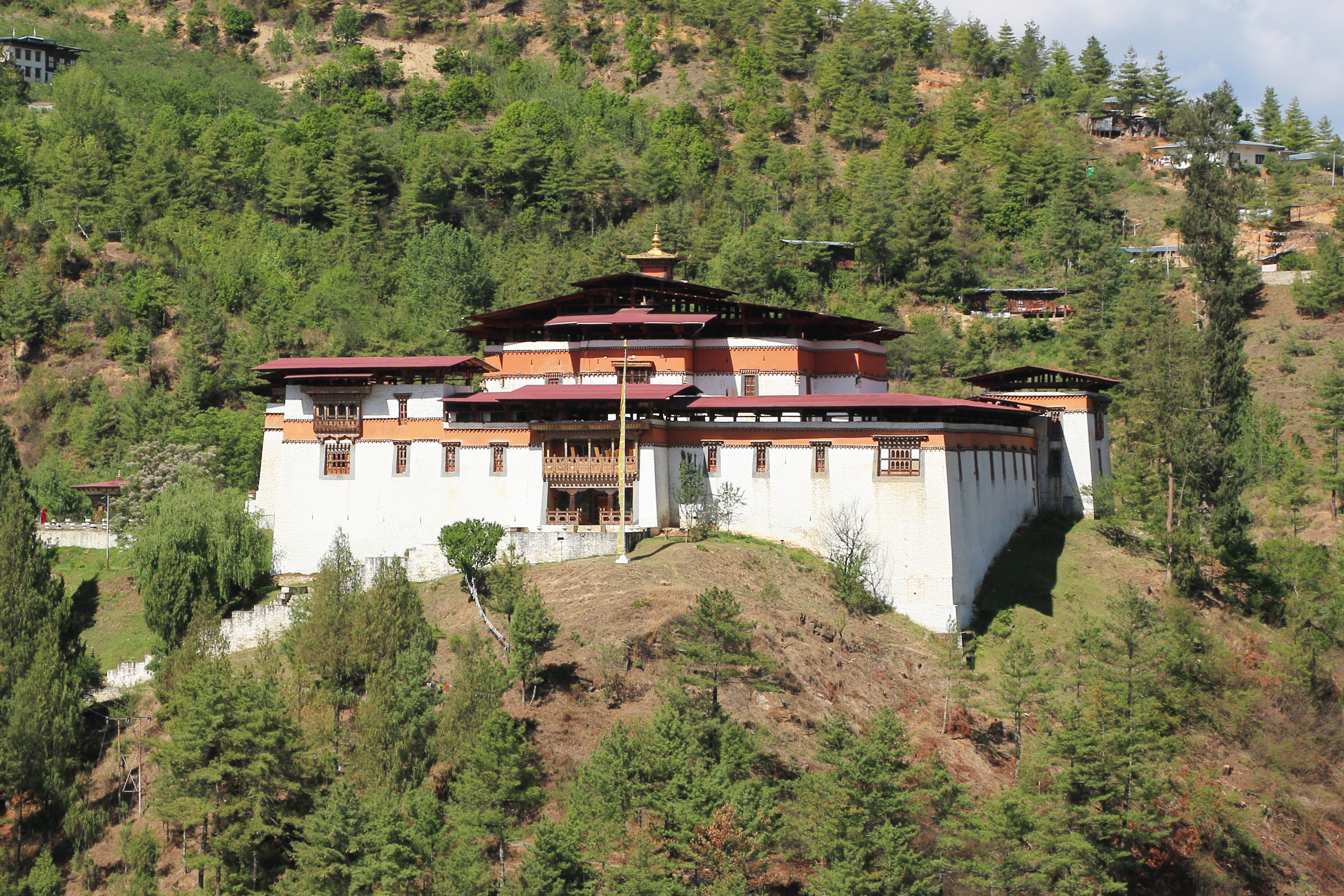
- Simtokha Dzong

- Location within Bhutan

Religion
- Affiliation: Tibetan Buddhism

Location
- Location: Thimphu, Bhutan
- Country: Bhutan
- Interactive map of Simtokha Dzong
- Coordinates: 27°26′17″N 89°40′10″E

Architecture
- Style: Dzong architecture
- Founder: Ngawang Namgyal
- Established: 1628; 398 years ago

Simtokha Dzong ('dzong' means "castle-monastery") also known as Sangak Zabdhon Phodrang (Bhutanese language meaning: "Palace of the Profound Meaning of Secret Mantras") is a small dzong. It was built in 1628 by Zhabdrung Ngawang Namgyal, who unified Bhutan. It is the first of its kind built in Bhutan. An important historical monument and former Buddhist monastery, today it houses one of the premier Dzongkha language learning institutes. It recently underwent renovation.

== Location ==
The dzong is at strategic security location on a prominent ridge vis-a-vis the Thimphu valley and approach roads to the Dochula Pass and eastern Bhutan. The Simtokha is located about 5 kilometres (3.1 mi) south of the Bhutanese capital of Thimphu. The location of the Dzong has a huge importance. The present place where the dzong stands at the boundary common to three prominent western regions: Sha (Wangduephodrang), Wang (Thimphu) and Pa (Paro).

== History ==
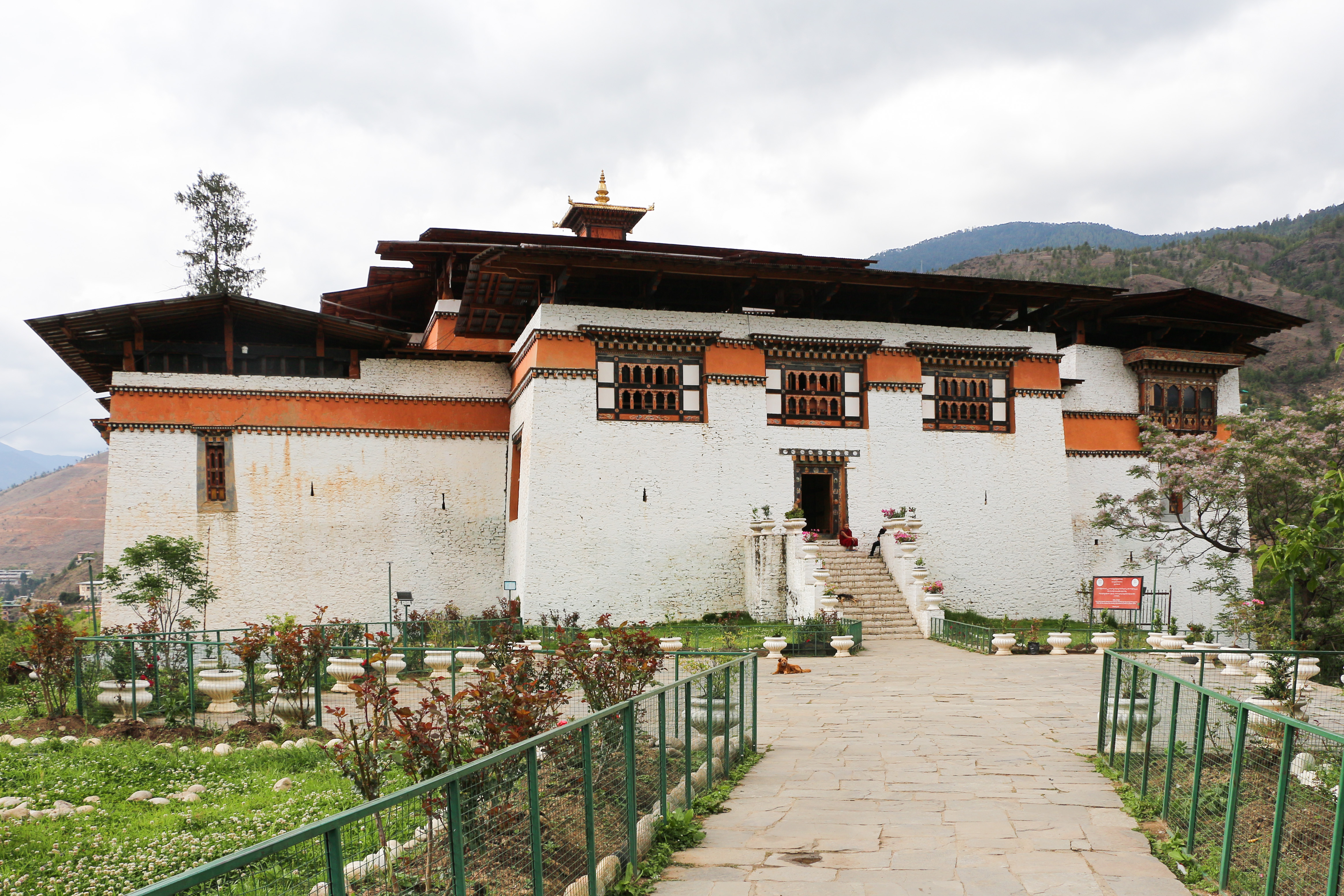
Simtokha Dzong

The Simtoka Dzong, built in 1629 by Zhabdrung Ngawang Namgyal, functions as a monastic and administrative centre and is the oldest dzong which has survived in its original form; Namgyal brought into vogue, for the first time in Bhutan, this concept of the "dzong" as castle monastery. An attack on the dzong was made by five disgruntled lamas in collaboration with an invading army of Tibetans who were against the Buddhist practices of the dzong under the control of Zhabdrung. They were defeated and Palden Lama who was the leader of the invaders died in the battle. Another attack on the dzong in 1630 by the Tibetans was successful for a while till part of the dzong caught fire and with the roof collapsing all the invading forces were killed.

The first renovation and extension works on the dzong was completed in 1670 by Mingyur Tenpa, the third Druk Desi (regent). It has undergone many renovations in subsequent years also and the most recent refurbishing was carried out by architects from Japan.

It is believed that the dzong provided protection against a demon which had disappeared into a rock close to the site and hence taken the name 'Simtoka' meaning "simmo" (demoness) and 'do' meaning "stone".

The Buddhist school of Linguistics was established as part of the dzong by the third Druk Gyalpo, Jigme Dorji Wangchuck, at the suggestion of Queen Mayum Choying Wangmo Dorje, in 1961.

Bhutanese Prime Minister Lotay Tshering and Indian Prime Minister Narendra Modi held an official meeting and documents exchange ceremony at Simtokha Dzong on 17 August 2019. This was the first time that the monument was used as a venue for international diplomacy.

== Features ==
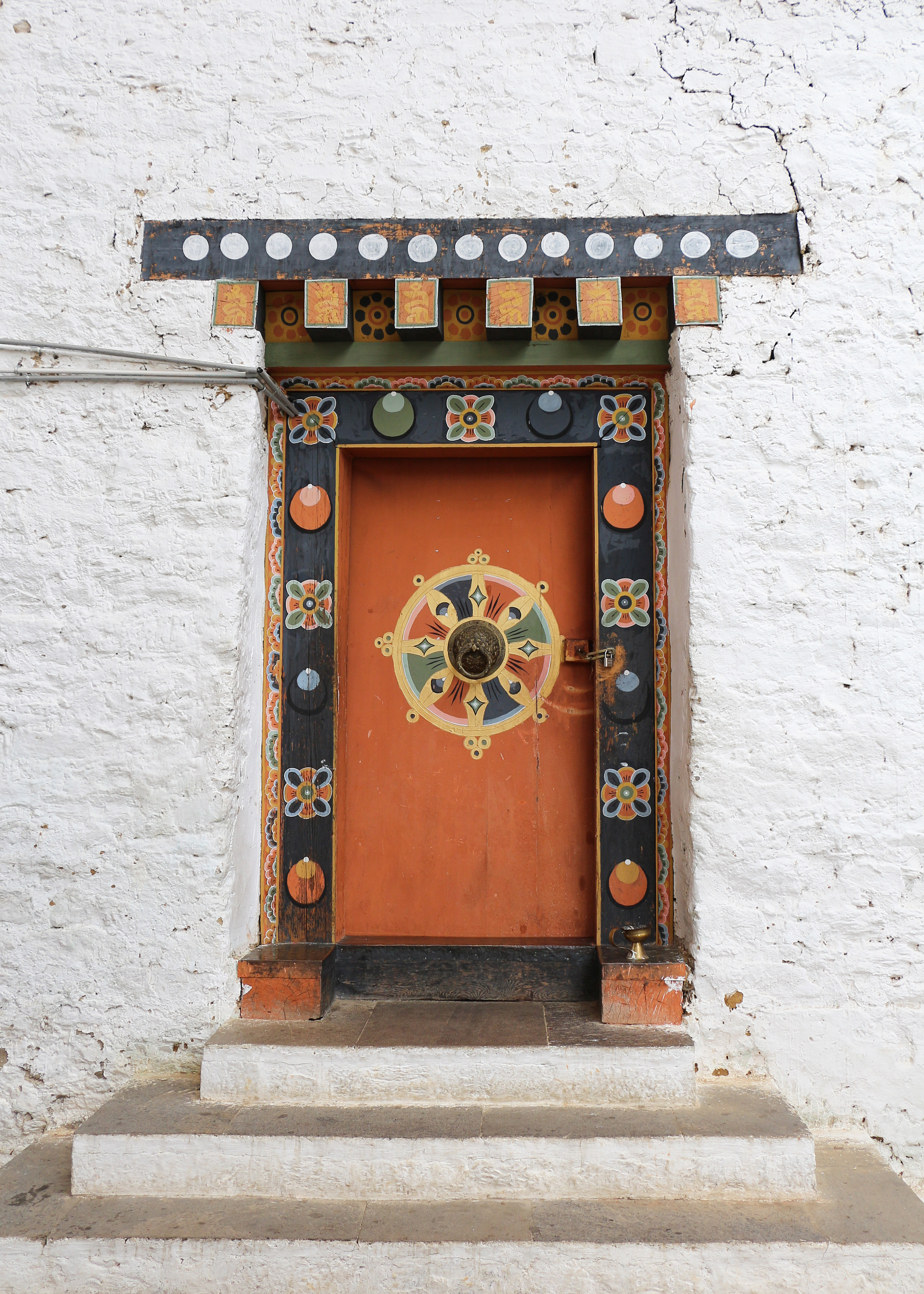
A door in the Simtokha Dzong

The dzong, covering an area of about 60 m^{2} (650 sq ft), has only one entry gate from the south while in the past it was on the west. The dzong built over three floors is covered on the exterior at the lowest level with prayer wheels where there is also an array of 300 carvings made of slate which depict saints and philosophers. The main lhakhang (chapel) has a large image of the Sakyamuni (Buddha), with images of eight bodhisattvas on both sides. There are many dark mural paintings within this lhakhang which are said to be some of the oldest in Bhutan. The chapel to the west of the main Lhakhang has images of Chenresig, green and white Taras (designated as both green and white). There is also an old painting of Zhabdrung Ngawang Namgyal, the founder of the dzong which was cleaned in 1995 but still shows signs of cracks. Also seen on the pillars of the eastern goenkhang are the tiger's tails and guns. There are chapels dedicated to the Yeshe Goennpo (Mahakala) and Pelden Lhamo, the protector deities of Bhutan.

In the genre of the Himalayan mural paintings of Himalayas, the cosmic mandala in the dzong is considered unique. It is a circle that is painted on the ceiling in the assembly hall or Tshogdu, within a square in the form of mountain ranges with yellow concentric squares. The circles within it are painted in several colours, making it distinctive, represents the twelve months of the year. The path of the course of sun's movement is painted as a line in the form of an ellipse in brick red colour; moons are also represented.

== Bibliography ==
- Bernier, Ronald M. (1997). Himalayan Architecture. Fairleigh Dickinson Univ Press. p. 58. ISBN 978-0-8386-3602-2.
- Berry, Steven K. (1 January 1988). The Thunder Dragon Kingdom: A Mountaineering Expedition to Bhutan. Crowood. ISBN 978-1-85223-146-0.
- Brown, Lindsay; Mayhew, Bradley (1 February 2014). Lonely Planet Bhutan. Lonely Planet Publications. ISBN 978-1-74321-947-8.
- Fellowship, World Education (1994). New Era in Education. World Education Fellowship.
- Khyentse, Dilgo; Rinpoche, Sogyal (January 2010). Brilliant Moon: The Autobiography of Dilgo Khyentse. Shambhala Publications. ISBN 978-1-59030-763-2.
