= The Historical Status of China's Tibet =

1997 Chinese government book

- Language: English
- Publisher: China Intercontinental Press
- Publication date: 1997

The Historical Status of China's Tibet is a book published in 1997 in English by China Intercontinental Press, the propaganda press for the government of the People's Republic of China. The book presents the Chinese government's official position on the history of Tibet and contends that Tibet has been under the sovereignty of China since the Yuan dynasty.

== Background ==
Given the de facto independence of Tibet in the first half of the twentieth century, the Chinese government is sensitive to the argument that its sovereignty over Tibet is illegitimate.

As indicated in a postscript, the text of the first edition (1997) was the work of five co-authors: "The intro and Chapters 8-9 were rewritten by Wang Gui; Chapters 1-4 by Wu Wei; Chapters 5 and 7 by Yang Gyaincain; Chapters 6 and 12 by Xirab Nyima; and Chapters 10 and 11, as well as the Concluding Remarks by Tang Jiawei." It was a rewriting of an academic monograph entitled Comments on the Historical Status of Tibet that was co-authored by Wang Gui, Xirab Nyima and Tang Jiawei and published in 1995 by the Nationalities Press

The 1995 monograph itself was derived from an earlier Chinese response to Shakabpa's Tibet: A Political History authored by a team of Tibet-based writers and published by the Nationalities Publishing House in Beijing under a title that translates into English as Shakabpa's "Tibet: A Political History" and the True Face of Tibetan History.

The listed co-authors "Wang Jiawei" (王家伟) and "Nyima Gyaincain" (尼玛 坚赞, pinyin: Nímǎ jiānzàn), are pseudonyms, derived from the combination of the names of the five contributors to the text (Wang Gui, Tang Jiawei, Wu Wei, Xirab Nyima, Yang Gyaincain) as indicated by a postscript to the book.

== Presentation ==
The book presents the official position of the People's Republic of China on the legal status of Tibet, i.e. the argument that, in one way or another, Tibet has always been a Chinese domain, roughly from the thirteenth century.

The book criticizes the interpretations and conclusions of The Status of Tibet: History, Rights and Prospects in International Law, a 1987 book authored by Michael van Walt van Praag, who later became legal adviser to the 14th Dalai Lama. It also questions the analysis of some important historical events made by Tibetan politician and historian Tsepon W. D. Shakabpa.

== Other versions ==
Originally published in both Chinese and Tibetan in 1997 as well as in English, the book was translated and published in 2001 in French and then in 2003 in German, Spanish and Russian.

The Washington Institute of China Studies published the introduction and 8 chapters of the book (with abstracts) in its Vol. 4, No 1, 2009 to Vol. 7, No 1, 3012 issues of the Journal of the Washington Institute of Chinese Studies.

== Reception and analysis ==
According to Tibetologist John Powers, the book by Chinese authors was written to persuade Western readers that Tibetan claims of independence are unfounded and that historical facts show that Tibet has been part of China since time immemorial.

Tibetologist Gray Tuttle lumps in the same category The Historical Status of China's Tibet on the one hand and Tibet: A Political History by W. D. Shakabpa and The Status of Tibet by Michael C. van Walt van Praag on the other hand: "the historiography associated with the “Tibet is a part of China” argument and with the “Tibetan independence” argument both project anachronistic ideas of nation-states and even western international law back into the past."

== See also ==
- Tibetan sovereignty debate
- Tibet under Yuan rule
- Ming–Tibet relations
- Tibet under Qing rule
- Tibet (1912–1951)
- Annexation of Tibet by the People's Republic of China

== Bibliography ==
- Smith, Warren M., Book Review of Historical Status of China's Tibet by Wang Jiawei and Nyima Gyaincain (PDF), Radio Free Asia
