= Chen Qingying =

Chinese Tibetologist (1942–2022)

Chen Qingying (Chinese: 陈庆英; pinyin: Chén Qìngyīng; born 21 October 1941 in Nanchong, Sichuan, Republic of China (1912–1949) [1]) is a Chinese Tibetologist. He is the director of the History Research Institute under the China Tibetology Research Center (Zhongguo Zangxue yanjiu zhongxin).

== Education ==
At the age of 17, Chen Qingyin and his parents moved to Qinghai province (northwest China). He began his studies in physics at the Qinghai Nationalities College. After completing his studies, in 1964 he became a teacher of physics in the Haixi Mongolian and Tibetan Autonomous Prefecture first at Delingha High School, then at the Teachers' College for Ethnic Minorities.

As Qinghai is home to many Tibetans, Chen Qingling, who learned Tibetan at school and did odd jobs in Tibetan areas, took an interest in the history and culture of Tibet. After ten years of teaching, he decided to change from a physics professor to a tibetologist and got a degree in Tibetan from the Central Institute of Ethnic Minorities in Beijing. He then embarked on a research work on ancient Tibetan as part of a master's degree that he obtained in 1981.

== Career ==
Chen Qingying has conducted research on the history, religion and culture of the Tibetan ethnic group at the Central Institute of National Minority Ethnic Groups, the Academy of Social Sciences of Qinghai Province and the China Tibetology Research Center. He is fluent in Tibetan, and even some local dialects.

== Interests ==
One of the most important subjects of Chen Qingying's research is Drogön Chögyal Phagpa, the fifth leader of the Sakya school of Tibetan Buddhism and the first Imperial Preceptor of Kublai Khan's Mongolian Empire, referred to by Chinese sources as the "Chinese Yuan Dynasty."

== Publications ==
=== Books ===
He wrote more than 20 books related to Tibet history. According to Amazon description, his masterpiece The System of the Dalai Lama Reincarnation was written on the basis of historical data and archives.

- Tibetan History (English edition), Series of basic information of Tibet of China, China Intercontinental Press, Beijing, 2003, 181 p., ISBN 7508502345
- L'histoire du Tibet (French edition), China Intercontinental Press, Beijing, 2004
- The System of the Dalai Lama Reincarnation (English edition), China Intercontinental Press, Beijing, 2005, 140 p. - New edition in 2014 under the title The Reincarnation System for the Dalai Lama
- The System of the Dalai Lama Reincarnation (Chinese edition), China Intercontinental Press, Beijing
- Le Régime de réincarnation du dalaï-lama (French edition), China Intercontinental Press, Beijing, 2005, 182 p.
- Reencarnación del Dalai Lama (Spanish edition), Editorial Intercontinental de China, Beijing, 164 p.
- Die Reinkarnation des Dalai Lama (German edition), China Intercontinental Press, Beijing, 2004, 194 p.
- A History of Tibet (part of the "Library of Tibetan Books" series, China Intercontinental Press, Beijing, 2016, 184 p.

=== Journal articles ===
- The Qing Dynasty's Golden Urn Lottery Systems: Its implementation in Tibet [Qingdai Jinping Cheqian Zhidu de Zhiding Jigi zai Xizang de Shishi], Journal of Tibet Nationalities Institute [Xizang Minzu Xueyguan Xuebao], 2006, 27, no 6, 1–8

=== Book chapters ===
- (with Wang Xiangyun) Tibetology in China: a Survey, in Images of Tibet in the 19th and 20th Centuries, Monica Esposito ed., Ecole française d'Extrême-Orient, 2008, 611–681

=== Editorship ===
- Tibet's Historical and Cultural Landscape, Wangchen Gelek and Chen Qingying eds., Foreign Language Press, 2006
- Xizang Lishi Wenhua Cidian (Encyclopaedia of Tibetan History and Culture), Wang Yao and Chen Qingying eds., Hangzhou: Xizang Renmin Chubunshe & Zhejiang Renmin Chubanshe, 1998
