= 12th Gyalwang Drukpa =

Bhutanese spiritual leader

Gyalwang Drukpa
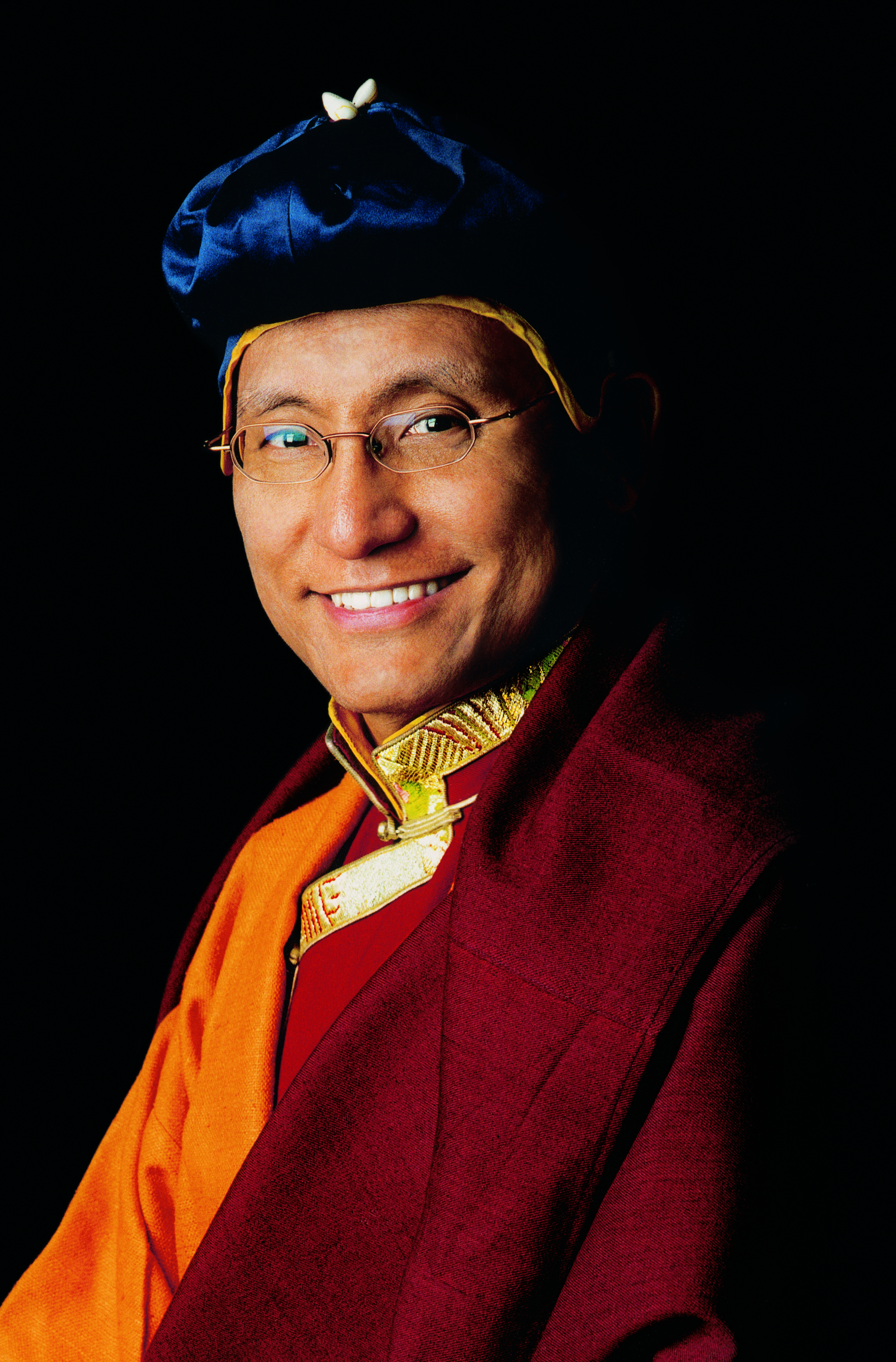
- Title: Gyalwang

Personal life
- Born: Jigmet Pema Wangchen; 1963 (age 62–63) (Rewalsar, Mandi); Himachal Pradesh

Religious life
- Religion: Vajrayana (Drukpa Kagyu)

The 12th Gyalwang Drukpa, Jigmet Pema Wangchen (Tibetan: འཇིགས་མེད་པདྨ་དབང་ཆེན་, Wylie: "jigs med pad+ma dbang chen, born 1963), is the head of the Drukpa Lineage school, which is one of the independent Sarma (new) schools of Tibetan Buddhism. In Drukpa, druk means 'dragon' which is a symbol of love and peace.

== Drukpa Lineage ==
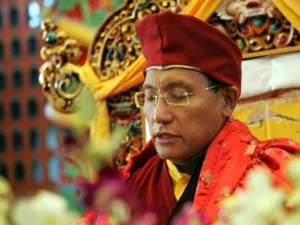

The Drukpa lineage was founded in 1206 after Drogon Tsangpa Gyare, (Drogon - 'Protector of Beings'; Tsang - 'born in the land of Tsang'; Gya - 'from the noble clan of Chinese (Gya) origin'; Re - 'a cotton-clad yogi') after he saw nine dragons fly into the sky from the ground at Namdruk. He is known as the First Gyalwang Drukpa and is recognized as the indisputable emanation of Naropa (1016–1100).

Jigme Pema Wangchen is the twelfth and present incarnation of the Gyalwang Drukpa. He was born while his parents were on pilgrimage in Tso Pema (Rewalsar, Mandi) Himachal Pradesh, a sacred place of Padmasambhava, during the festival and a major ceremony of lama dances and a holy fest celebrating Guru Padmasambhava's birthday, in 1963. His father, Zhichen Bairochana, is a Dzogchen Master, these days commonly called Bairo Rinpoche. His mother, Kelsang Yudron, commonly known as Mayumla, came from Lhodrak, in southern Tibet.

The name Jigmet Pema Wangchen was given right after his birth by Dudjom Rinpoche, at that time head of the Nyingma school of Tibetan Buddhism: "My name, Jigmet Pema Wangchen was given by the holy Master Dudjom Yeshe Dorje with his traditional congratulations and divine blessings. Ever since then, I am blessed and entirely protected by him and Guru Padmasambhava forever." He was enthroned as a reincarnation of the 11th Gyalwang Drukpa at the age of four at Druk Thupten Sangag Choeling Monastery in Darjeeling, his main monastery.

== Humanitarian activities and recognitions ==
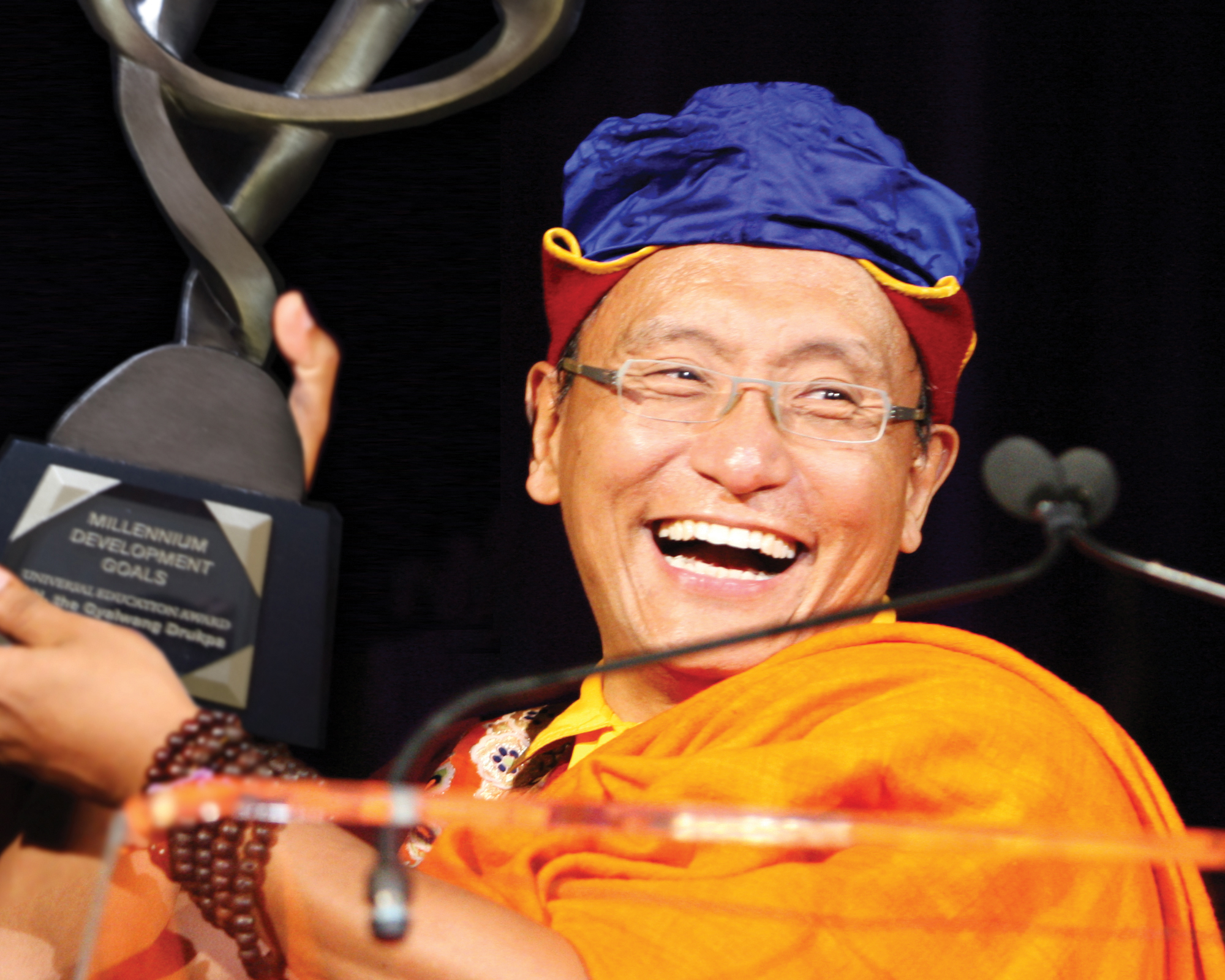

The Gyalwang Drukpa is an active environmentalist, educator and the spiritual head of the Drukpa Lineage, one of the main Buddhist schools of the Himalayas founded by the great Indian saint Naropa (1016–1100CE) with a thousand-year legacy in India. He applies ancient Buddhist philosophy to resolve today's problems and has millions of followers worldwide.

One of the Gyalwang Drukpa's main focuses is on environmental preservation and education, which puts into action the core Buddhist principle that all beings are interconnected and interdependent. His mission is to promote universal harmony and inner peace by integrating the spiritual tenets of love and appreciation into daily life. His work also includes encouraging gender equality, establishing educational institutions, medical clinics and meditation centres and rebuilding heritage sites in the Himalayas. He is the founder and spiritual director of the award-winning Druk White Lotus School in Ladakh, India, which provides its students with a modern education while preserving their local culture.

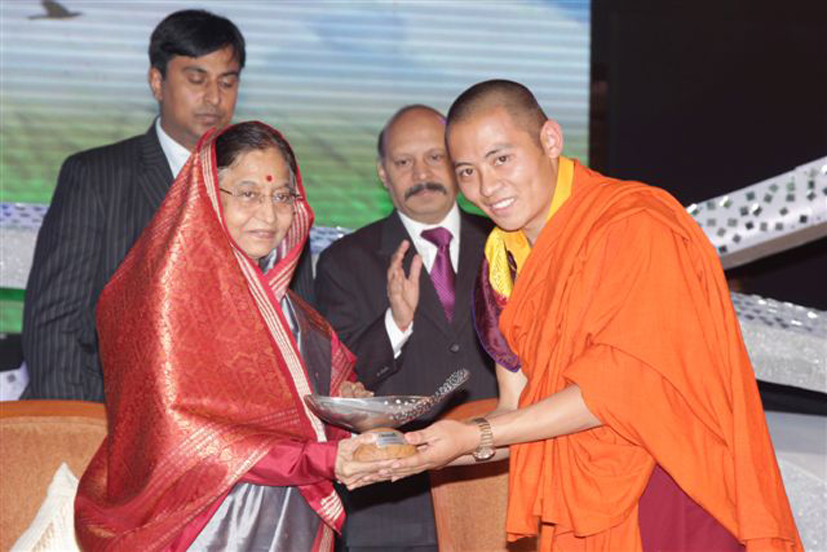
Green Hero Award for the Gyalwang Drukpa, received on his behalf by Drukpa Thuksey Rinpoche

Emphasizing that everyone can have a dramatic positive impact on the community around them, the Gyalwang Drukpa teaches that we should put compassion into action. In recognition of these activities, the Gyalwang Drukpa received the United Nations Millennium Development Goals (MDG) Honour in September 2010 and three months later in December 2010, he received Green Hero Award, presented by the President of India.

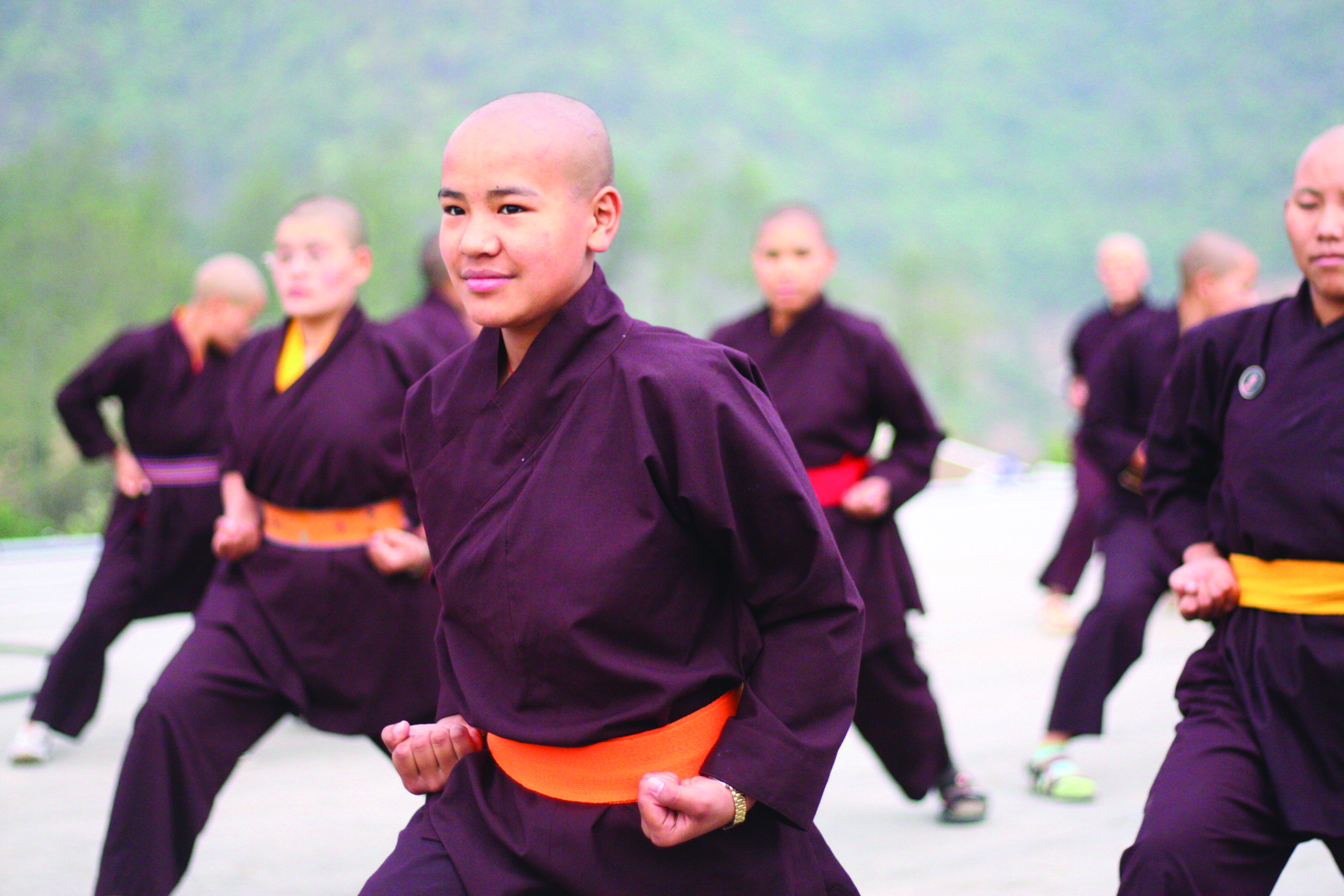
Kung Fu Nuns of the Drukpa Order

Historically, women in the Himalayas have struggled to receive equal treatment, sometimes being ostracised for seeking to practise spirituality. The Gyalwang Drukpa is working to change this and has established the Druk Gawa Khilwa Nunnery – a modern and green abbey outside Kathmandu, Nepal with a satellite abbey in Ladakh, India. There, women receive a modern education, as well as spiritual training historically reserved for men. In an effort to instill self-confidence, the Gyalwang Drukpa has also authorized them to learn kung fu, training that was off-limits to women for over two centuries. These kung fu nuns are gaining worldwide recognition. A BBC News documentary featured them. In addition, they have performed at the Olympic Park in London and at the CERN in Geneva.

The Gyalwang Drukpa regularly addresses the international community on contemporary issues including environmental protection, gender equality and religious tolerance. He attends the annual United Nations week in New York, where he speaks at different UN Women's forums meeting with like-minded women leaders such as Cherie Blair, Geena Davis and Her Royal Highness Princess Basmah bint Saud, attends high-level meetings concerning world conflicts, and participates at various discussions on climate change.

The Gyalwang Drukpa also collaborates with well-respected international organizations to promote the message of active compassion as well as to find effective and sustainable solutions to bridge materialism and spirituality. Most recently, the Gyalwang Drukpa visited the CERN in Switzerland with several of his kung fu nuns to discuss the seeming tension of religion and science in society, as well as the improvement of gender equality. He often meets with several United Nations branches, including the World Health Organization, to discuss, among other things, potential cooperation in improving health worldwide.

=== Live to Love ===
In his effort to use Buddhist approaches to solve modern day problems, the Gyalwang Drukpa founded the Live to Love global humanitarian movement in 2007. Live to Love is an international consortium of secular, non-profit organizations working together to achieve five aims: Education, Environmental Protection, Medical Services, Relief Aid and Heritage Preservation.

==== Environmental protection ====
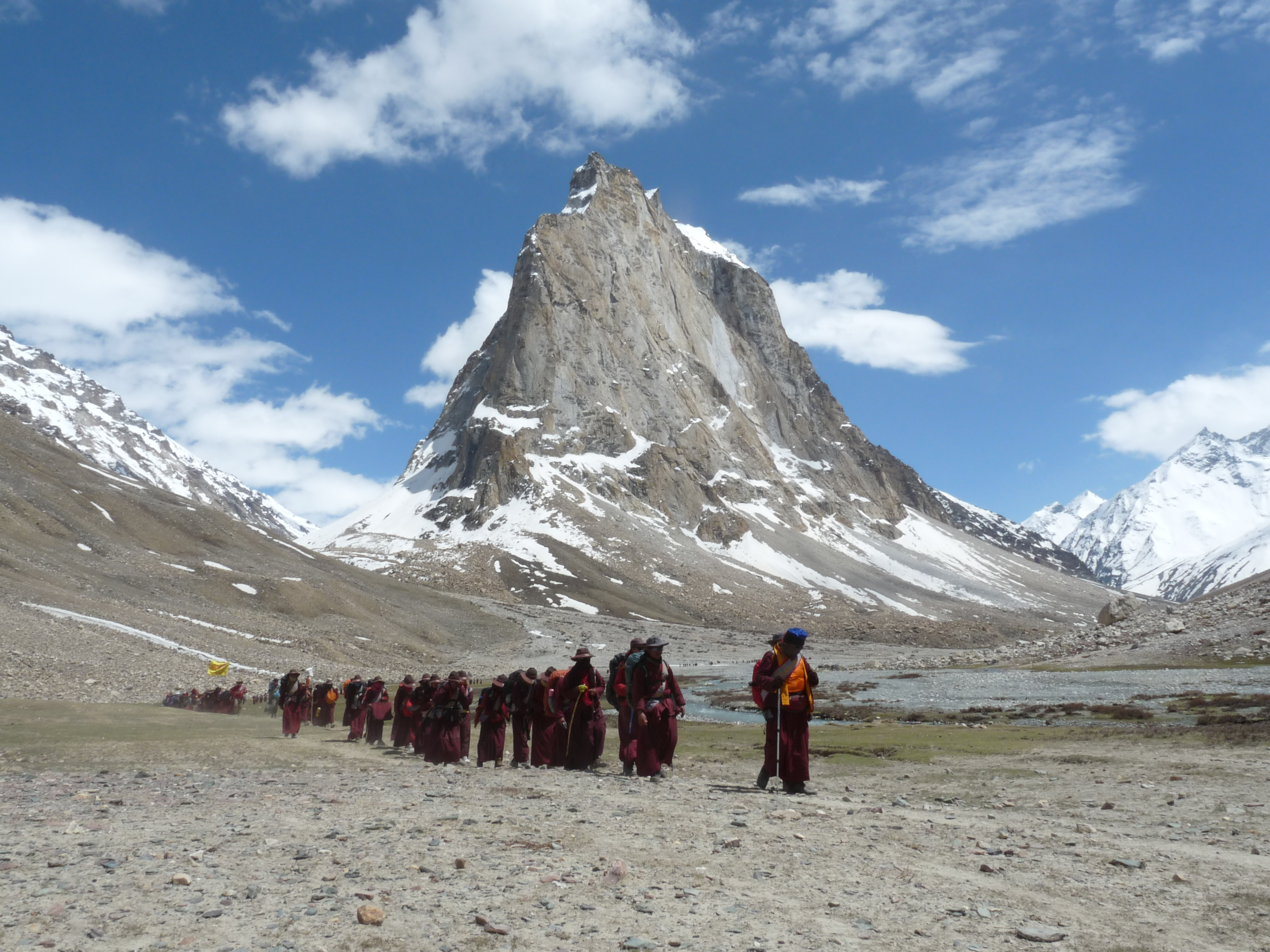

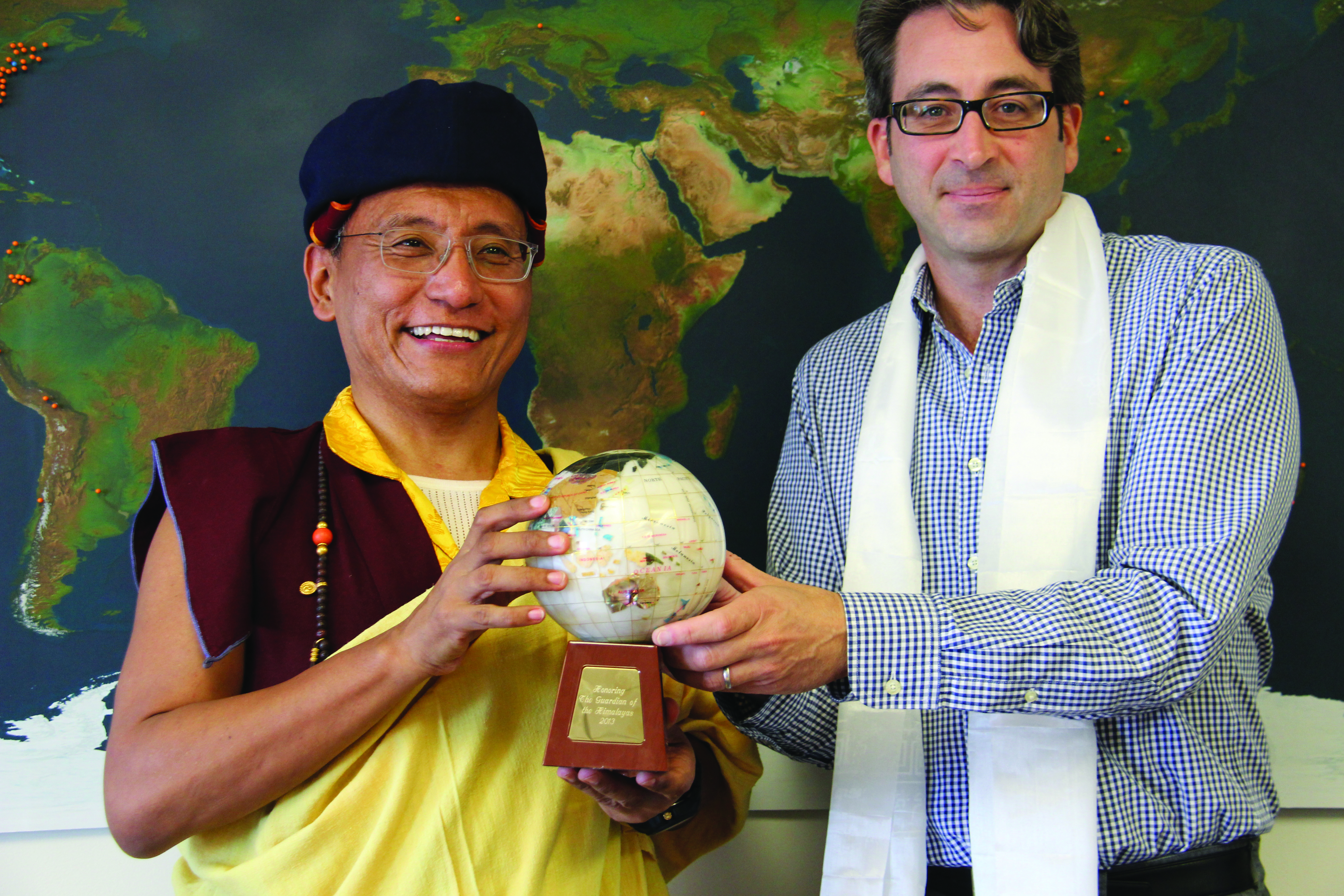
The Gyalwang Drukpa named "The Guardian of the Himalayas"

The Himalayan region, known as the 'third pole' supplies water to nearly one-half of the world's population and is affected by global warming. Live to Love sponsors several notable projects focused on environmental protection of this fragile eco-system. Live to Love hosts the 'Eco Pad Yatra,' ('Pad' means 'foot' and 'Yatra' means journeying, 'Pad Yatra' means 'journey on foot') a trek in which hundreds of volunteers hike hundreds of miles collecting plastic waste. Live to Love also plants native trees in the region, cleaning the air of toxins and stabilizing the soil. In September 2013, during the UN week, the Gyalwang Drukpa was named 'The Guardian of the Himalayas' by Waterkeeper Alliance, founded in 1999 by environmental lawyer Robert F. Kennedy Jr. and several Waterkeeper organisations.

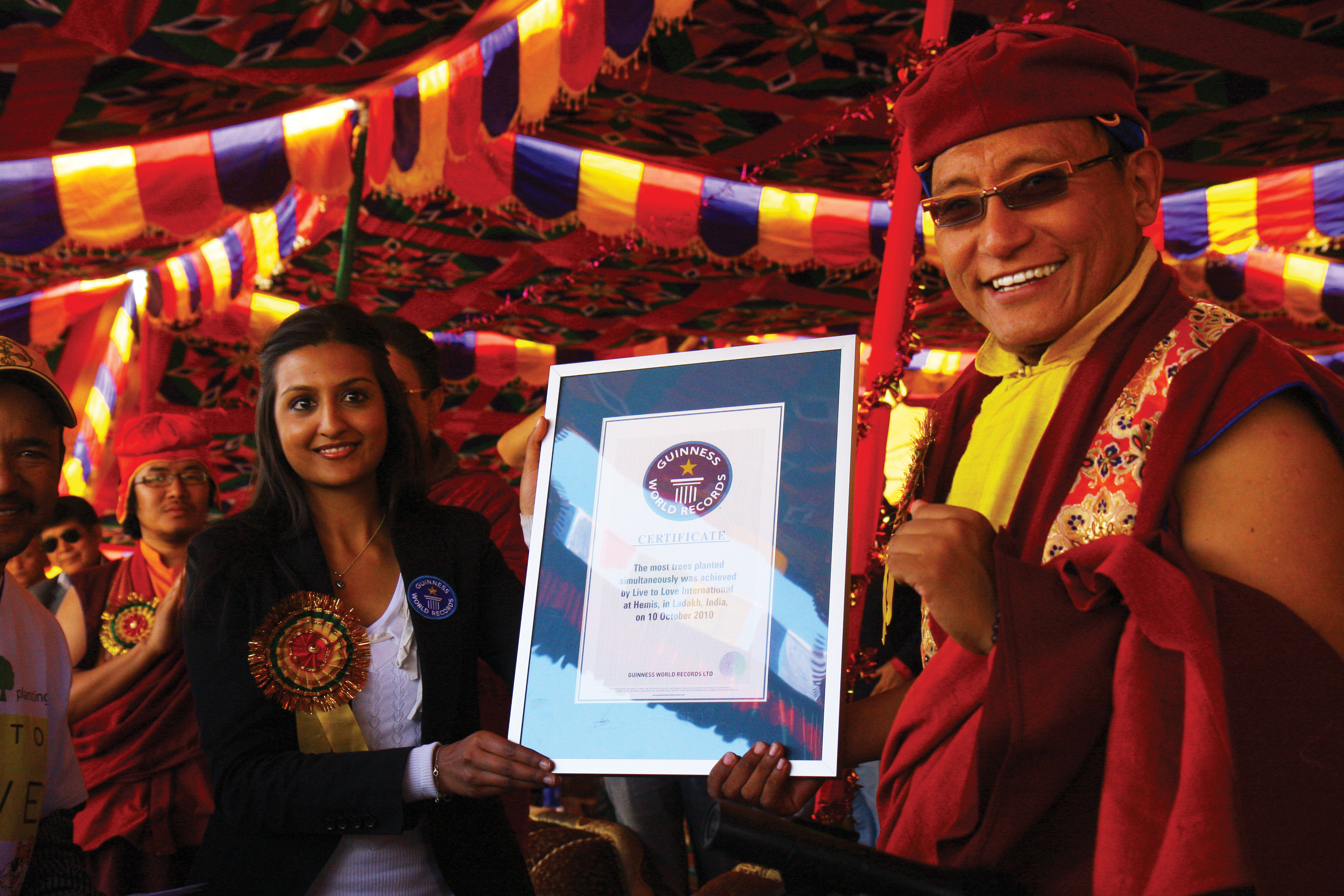

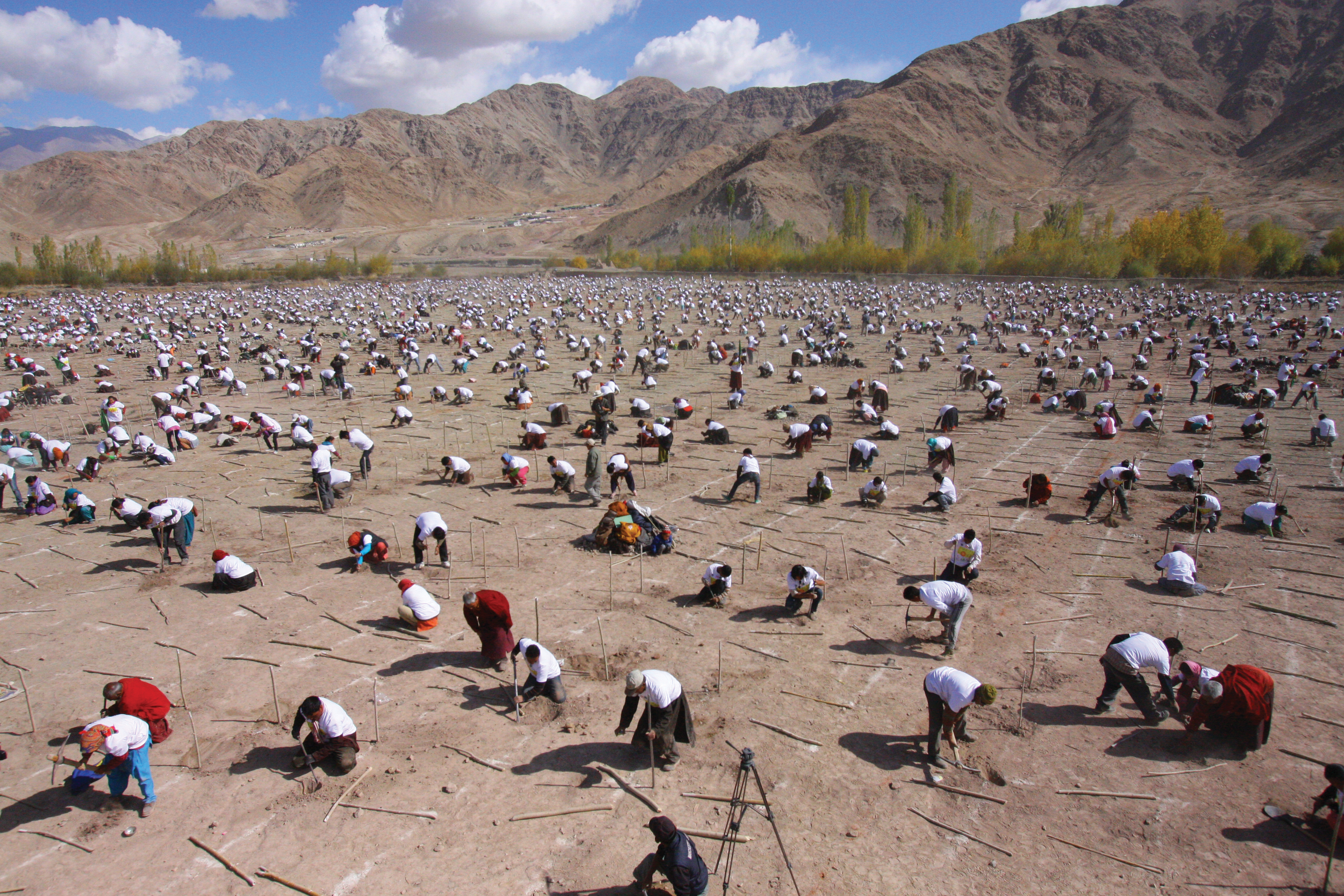
Guinness World Records for "Most Trees Planted" broken in October 2010 and 2012

In 2010, the Gyalwang Drukpa launched an initiative to plant one million trees in Ladakh, as part of the 'one million trees' campaign initiated by Wangari Maathaï, recipient of the Nobel Peace Prize in 2004. As part of this initiative, the Gyalwang Drukpa led the Live to Love volunteers to break the Guinness World Record twice for most trees planted simultaneously. In October 2012, over 9,800 volunteers planted nearly 100,000 trees, safeguarding villages from mudslides and cleaning polluted air.

==== Education ====
The people of Ladakh, India, preserve a unique Buddhist lifestyle. As modernization occurs, they are losing their indigenous culture and are having difficulty competing in the new economy. With approximately 1,000 students, the Druk White Lotus School seeks to provide its students a modern education while instilling a respect for the unique indigenous culture of this region. This curriculum includes courses in English and computer skills, as well as the local language and art. The school has won multiple accolades for its sustainable design including three World Architecture Awards and the Inspiring Design Award from the British Council for School Environments. The school has been the subject of an acclaimed PBS documentary (USA), narrated by Brat Pitt, and has been featured in the Bollywood blockbuster film, '3 Idiots' starring Aamir Khan.

==== Medical services ====
Many remote Himalayan communities lack basic medical services. The Druk White Lotus Clinic, recently opened and operational, is located on Druk Amitabha Mountain outside of Kathmandu, Nepal, and provides regular medical care for the community living on the mountain. At the guidance of the Gyalwang Drukpa Live to Love also hosts temporary medical clinics in Ladakh, India, including an annual eye clinic in which doctors replace the corneas of individuals who have lost sight due to eye disease. After a relatively simple surgery, patients who were blind can see. Further, Live to Love seeks to train amchis, practitioners of traditional Himalayan medicine, to provide basic medical care to very remote communities and liaise with allopathic doctors to treat more serious illnesses.

==== Relief aid ====
In August 2010, a flash flood from an unexpected cloudburst devastated Ladakh, killing hundreds and leaving thousands homeless. The Gyalwang Drukpa's Live to Love international and domestic volunteers distributed necessities to those in need. They provided nearly 300 units of LPG gas tanks and cooking stoves to displaced families to replace more dangerous portable kerosene stoves. The Druk White Lotus School took in children left homeless because of the flash flood. In light of this disaster, Live to Love seeks to train local Himalayan volunteers in disaster relief expertise in the coming years to provide a rapid, formal response to future events. The Gyalwang Drukpa himself visited, on foot, 50 remote villages affected by the flash flood.

==== Heritage preservation ====
The culture and art of Ladakh, India is primarily Buddhist. Because Ladakh is located along the Silk Route, many locations present rare examples of Gandhara and Bamiyan style Buddhist art, which synthesizes Byzantine, Roman-Greco, Scytho-Parthian and Indian elements. Most examples of this style of art have been destroyed in Afghanistan and Pakistan. At the instruction of the Gyalwang Drukpa, Live to Love seeks to preserve this unique art. In addition, Live to Love is beginning an initiative to digitally archive blockprints, manuscripts and texts found in community buildings and homes that reflect and chronicle the culture and history of Ladakh.

== Indian government-issued commemorative stamp ==
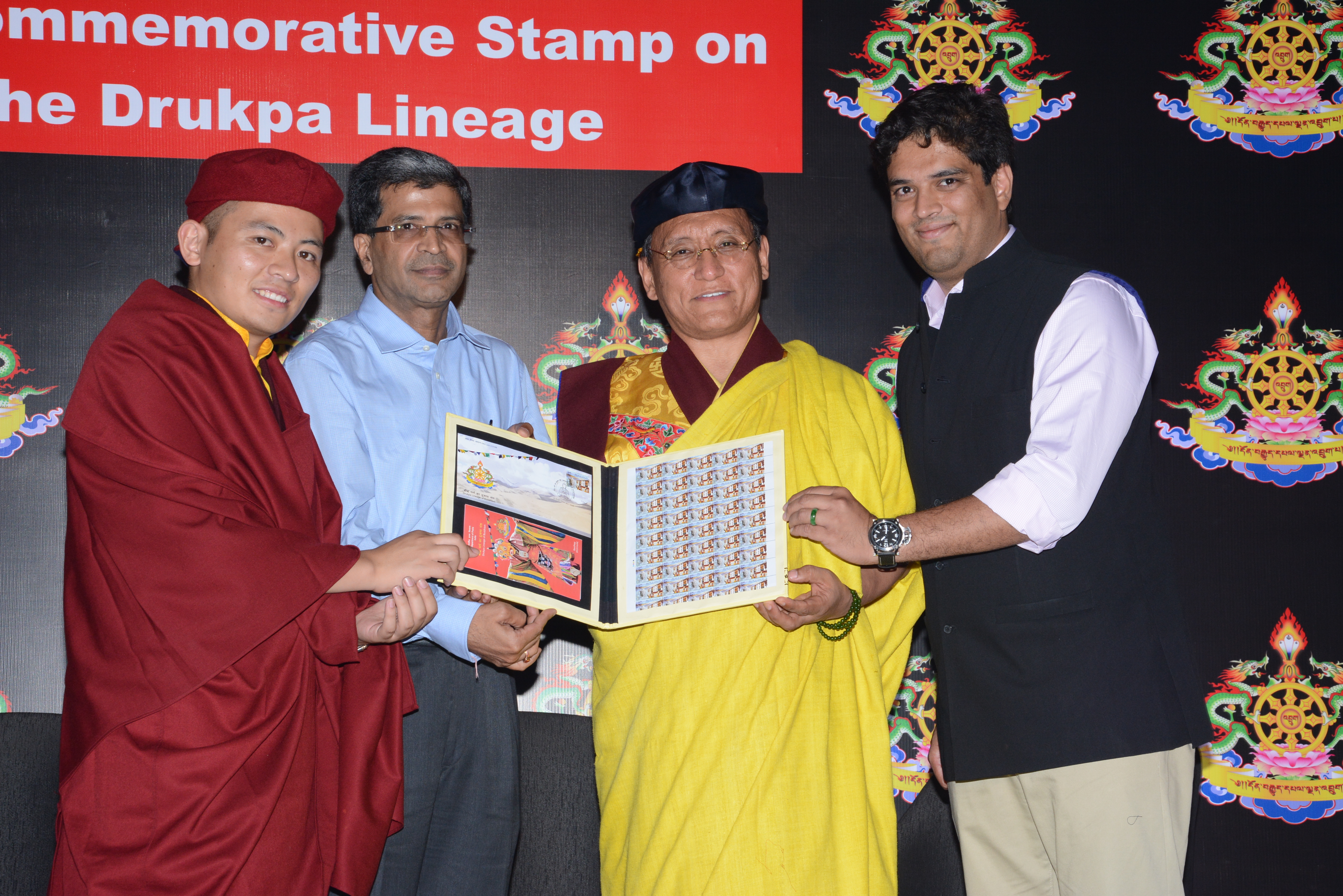
His Eminence Drukpa Thuksey Rinpoche, Shri SK Sinha, Member (HRD), Department of Posts-Government of India, the Gyalwang Drukpa and Arjun Pandey holding the newly released stamp and first day cover on "The Drukpa Lineage of Buddhism"

On 14 May 2014, Department of Posts-Government of India celebrated Buddha Purnima with the release of a commemorative stamp on the Drukpa Buddhists, a rare and perhaps first recognition given by the Indian government to a particular Buddhist lineage. The commemorative stamp celebrating the 999 years of Drukpa Lineage was released by Shri SK Sinha, Member (HRD), Department of Posts in the presence of the Gyalwang Drukpa, spiritual head of Drukpa Buddhists and Drukpa Thuksey Rinpoche, spiritual regent of the lineage, at Ashok Hotel in Delhi.

== Main monastic centres ==
- Namdruk, Ralung and Sangag Choeling in Tibet
- Druk Thupten Sangag Choeling in Darjeeling, India
- Hemis Monastery in Ladakh, India
- Druk Amitabha Mountain in Kathmandu, Nepal.

== Humanitarian projects ==
The Gyalwang Drukpa is the founder of The Druk White Lotus School in Ladakh, India, an award-winning environmentally friendly institution that provides a blend of traditional and modern education for the children of Ladakh.

In 2010 he was awarded the Bharat Jyoti Award of the India International Friendship Society.
