= Mipham =

Mipham may refer to:

- Jamgon Ju Mipham Gyatso (1846–1912), famous Rime and Nyingma scholar and author
- Mipham Chokyi Lodro (1952–2014), 14th Shamar Rinpoche
- Sakyong Mipham (born 1962)
- Pang Mipham Gonpo (spangs mi pham mgon po) - disciple of Vairotsana
- Gyalwang Mipham Wangpo (1654–1717), 4th Gyalwang Drukchen
- Mipham Chökyi Nangwa (1768–1822), 8th Gyalwang Drukchen
- Mipham Chökyi Gyatsho (1823–1883), 9th Gyalwang Drukchen
- Mipham Chökyi Wangpo (1884–1930), see Gyalwang Drukpa
