= Ngawang Namgyal =

Bhutanese Lama (1594–1651)

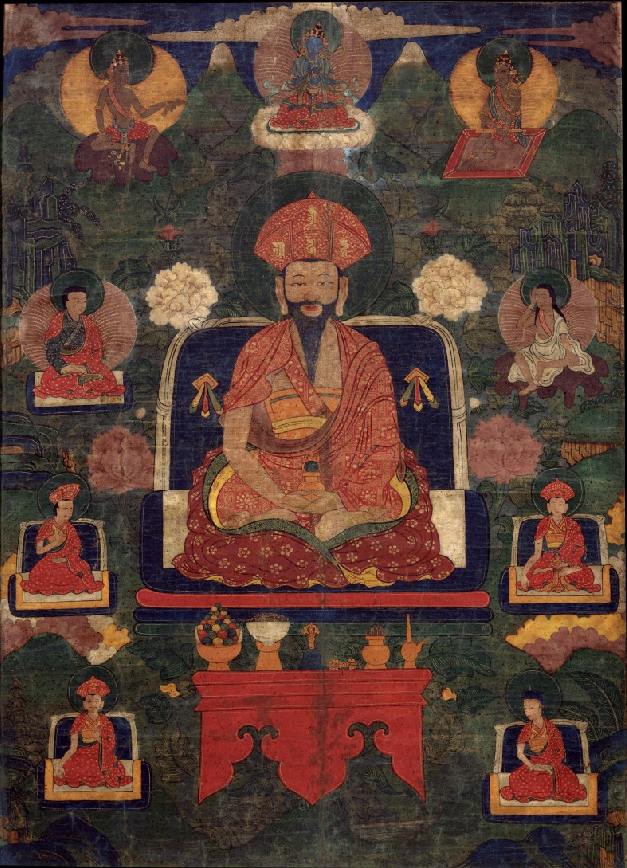
Zhabdrung in a seventeenth-century painting

Ngawang Namgyal (Tibetan: ཞབས་དྲུང་ངག་དབང་རྣམ་རྒྱལ་, Wylie: zhabs drung ngag dbang rnam rgyal; alternative spellings include Zhabdrung Ngawang Namgyel; 1594–1651), known colloquially as The Bearded Lama, was a Tibetan Buddhist Drukpa Kagyu school Rinpoche, and the unifier of Bhutan as a nation-state. He was later granted the honorific title Zhabdrung Rinpoche, approximately "at whose feet one submits". In addition to unifying the various warring fiefdoms for the first time in the 1630s, he also sought to create a distinct Bhutanese cultural identity separate from the Tibetan culture from which it was derived.

== Birth and enthronement at Ralung ==
Zhabdrung Ngawang Namgyal was born at Ralung Monastery (Wylie: rwa lung), Tibet, as the son of the Drukpa Kagyu lineage-holder Mipham Tenpa’i Nyima (Wylie: 'brug pa mi pham bstan pa'i nyi ma, 1567–1619) and Sönam Pelgyi Butri (Wylie: bsod nams dpal gyi bu khrid), daughter of the local ruler of Kyishö (Wylie: sde pa skyid shod pa) in Tibet. Through his father’s line, Ngawang Namgyal was a direct descendant of Tsangpa Gyare (1161–1211), the founder of the Drukpa Lineage.

During his youth, Ngawang Namgyal was enthroned as the eighteenth Drukpa or throne-holder (Gyalwang Drukpa) and hereditary prince of the traditional Drukpa seat at Ralung. He was also recognized as the reincarnation of the “Omniscient” Kunkhyen Pema Karpo (Wylie: kun mkhyen pad ma dkar po, 1527–1592). (Note: Depending on whether or not Tsangpa Gyare is included in the enumeration of Gyalwang Drukpa incarnations, Kunkhyen Pema Karpo is regarded as either the fourth or fifth Drukchen, and Zhabdrung Ngawang Namgyal or Pagsam Wangpo as the fifth or sixth. Some Bhutanese and Ralung sources do not count Tsangpa Gyare as the first Drukchen but begin with Gyalwang Je Kunga Paljor (1428–1476).)

His recognition and enthronement at Ralung as the Drukpa incarnation were opposed by Lhatsewa Ngawang Zangpo, a prominent disciple of Pema Karpo, who supported a rival claimant—Gyalwang Pagsam Wangpo—an illegitimate son of the Chongje ruler, Ngawang Sönam Dragpa. Lhatsewa and the Chongje faction organized a parallel enthronement of Pagsam Wangpo as the reincarnation of Kunkhyen Pema Karpo and as Gyalwang Drukpa at Tashi Thongmen Monastery.

The Chongje ruler subsequently gained the support of the King of Tsang, Karma Phuntsok Namgyal (Wylie: karma phun tshogs rnam rgyal), one of the most powerful regional leaders in Tibet and a patron of the rival Karma Kagyu school. By 1612, the Tsang ruler had consolidated power over the regions of Ü and Tsang, strengthening the position of Pagsam Wangpo’s supporters.

Despite these rival claims, Ngawang Namgyal continued to reside at Ralung as the legitimate hereditary Drukpa lineage-holder and abbot of the main seat of the Drukpa tradition, maintaining spiritual and administrative authority within the monastery.

== From Tibet to Bhutan ==
However, following a misunderstanding Zhabdrung Rinpoche and his party had with an important Karma Kagyu lama, Pawo Tsugla Gyatsho (1568–1630), the Tsang Desi demanded that compensation be paid, and that the sacred religious relics of Ralung—such as the Rangjung Kharsapani—should be surrendered to him so they could be given to the rival Gyalwang Drukpa incarnate, Gyalwa Pagsam Wangpo.

The Tsang Desi prepared to send covert armed guards to arrest Zhabdrung Rinpoche and enforce his demands. In 1616, facing arrest and following visions (in which it is said that the chief guardian deities of Bhutan offered him a home), Zhabdrung Ngawang Namgyal left Tibet to establish a new base in western Bhutan through Gasa Dzongkhag, founding Cheri Monastery at the head of Thimphu valley.

In 1629, he built Simtokha Dzong at the entrance to Thimphu valley; from this dzong, he could exert control over traffic between the powerful Paro valley to the west and Trongsa valley to the east.

== Unification of Bhutan ==
Zhabdrung Rinpoche consolidated control over western Bhutan, subduing rivals belonging to the Lhapa, a branch of the Drikung Kagyu sect, which had built some of the original dzongs in Bhutan. The Drukpa Kagyu, the Lhapa Kagyu, and the Nenyingpa had all controlled parts of western Bhutan since the twelfth century. Later, Zhabdrung Rinpoche would conquer and unify all of Bhutan, but would allow the ancient, Nyingma and some Sakya sect to continue in central and eastern Bhutan (today the Nyingmapa comprise approximately thirty percent of Bhutan's monks, even though they are privately funded while the Southern Drukpa Kagyu is supported as the established state religion of Bhutan).

In 1627, the first European visitors to Bhutan—the Portuguese Jesuits Estêvão Cacella and João Cabral—found the Zhabdrung to be a compassionate and intelligent host, of high energy and fond of art and writing. In keeping with his position as a high lama, he was also meditative, and had just completed a three-year, silent retreat.

== Dual system of government ==
The Zhabdrung also established Bhutan's distinctive dual system of government under the Tsa Yig legal code, by which control of the country was shared between a spiritual leader (the Je Khenpo) to preside over the religious institutions, and an administrative leader (the Druk Desi) as head of secular affairs, a policy which exists, in modified form, to this day.

== Relations with Ladakh ==
Sengge Namgyal, who ruled Ladakh from 1616 to 1623 and 1624 to 1642, was a devotee of the Ralung lineage of the Drukpa school. Like Bhutan, Ladakh then had differences with the new Gaden Photrang government of Tibet established by the fifth Dalai Lama, which attempted to annex Ladakh.

An invitation was sent to Bhutan requesting that Zhabdrung Ngawang Namgyal become the state priest; as the Zhabdrung was occupied confronting an invasion from Tibet and consolidating the new Bhutanese state, he sent Choje Mukzinpa as his representative to the court of Ladakh. Several religious estates were offered to the Bhutanese in present-day Ladakh, Zangskar, and western Tibet (Ngari Korsum [mga' ris bskor gsum]), which was then part of Ladakh. One of them, Stakna Monastery or "Tiger's Nose," established by Choje Mukzinpa, became the main seat of the Southern Drukpa Kagyu tradition in Ladakh; this monastery still preserves artifacts and documents related to Bhutan, some of them said to have been gifted by Zhabdrung Ngawang Namgyal.

== Death ==
Zhabdrung Ngawang Namgyal died in 1651, and power effectively passed to the penlops (local governors), instead of to a successor Zhabdrung. In order to forestall a dynastic struggle and a return to warlordism, the governors conspired to keep the death of the Zhabdrung secret for fifty-four years; during this time, they issued orders in his name, explaining that he was on an extended, silent retreat.

The anniversary of the death of the Zhabdrung is celebrated as a Bhutanese national holiday, falling on the tenth day of the third month of the Bhutanese calendar. This day is known as Zhabdrung Kuchoe and is one of the most sacred and widely observed days in Bhutan. It is commemorated with religious ceremonies and prayers in major dzongs and monasteries across the country. His Majesty the King of Bhutan traditionally offers prayers at Punakha Dzong, the site closely associated with Zhabdrung's legacy, on this occasion.

Zhabdrung's death marked a turning point in Bhutanese history, creating a power vacuum that led to political fragmentation and internal struggles. Despite this, his legacy as the unifier of Bhutan and founder of its dual system of governance remains deeply revered in Bhutanese culture and history.

== Sources ==
- Ardussi, John (2004). "Formation of the State of Bhutan ('Brug gzhung) in the 17th Century and its Tibetan Antecedents" (PDF). Journal of Bhutan Studies. 11. Archived from the original (PDF) on 2016-04-24.
- Dargye, Yonten (2001). History of the Drukpa Kagyud School in Bhutan (12th to 17th Century A.D.). Thimphu. ISBN 99936-616-0-0.
- Dargye, Yonten; Sørensen, Per; Tshering, Gyönpo (2008). Play of the Omniscient: Life and works of Jamgön Ngawang Gyaltshen an eminent 17th-18th Century Drukpa master. Thimphu: National Library & Archives of Bhutan. ISBN 978-99936-17-06-8.
- Dorji, Sangay (Dasho) (2008). The Biography of Shabdrung Ngawang Namgyal: Pal Drukpa Rinpoche. Kinga, Sonam (trans.). Thimphu, Bhutan: KMT Publications. ISBN 978-99936-22-40-6.
- Karma Phuntsho (2013). The History of Bhutan. Nodia: Random House India. ISBN 9788184003116.
- Yoshiro Imaeda (2013). The Successors of Zhabdrung Ngawang Namgyel: Hereditary Heirs and Reincarnations. Thimphu: Riyang Books. p. 112. ISBN 978-99936-899-3-5.
