= List of energy efficient buildings in India =

Following is the list of energy efficient buildings according to climatic zones they are situated in.

== Climatic zones ==
=== Cold and sunny ===
- Degree College and Hill Council Complex, Leh
- Airport and staff housing colony, Kargil
- LEDeG Trainees’ Hostel, Leh
- Sarai for Tabo Gompa, Spiti
- The Druk White Lotus School, Shey, Ladakh

=== Cold And Cloudy ===
- Residence of Mohini Mullick, Bhowali, Nainital
- Himachal Pradesh State Co-operative Bank, Shimla
- MLA Hostel, Shimla
- Himurja Office Building, Shimla

=== Composite ===
- Bidani House, Faridabad
- Centre for Science and Environment (CSE), New Delhi
- Transport Corporation of India Ltd, Gurgaon
- SOS Tibetan Children's Village, Rajpur, Dehradun
- Redevelopment of property at Civil Lines, Delhi
- Integrated Rural Energy Programme Training Centre, Delhi
- Tapasya Block (Phase 1), Sri Aurobindo Ashram, New Delhi
- Water and Land Management Institute, Bhopal
- Baptist Church, Chandigarh
- Solar Energy Centre, Gwal Pahari, Gurgaon
- National Media Centre Co-operative Housing Scheme, Gurgaon
- ITC Centre, Gurgaon
- CII - Sohrabji Godrej Green Business Centre, Hyderabad
- Monama House, Hyderabad
- Green Leaf Hotel, Jasola

=== Hot and dry ===
- Indian Institute of Health Management Research, Jaipur
- Sangath – an architect's studio, Ahmedabad
- Torrent Research Centre, Ahmedabad
- Residence for Mahendra Patel, Ahmedabad
- Solar passive hostel, Jodhpur
- college of engineering, Phaltan

=== Moderate ===
- Residence for Mary Mathew, Bangalore
- TERI office building-cum-guest house, Bangalore

=== Warm and humid ===
- Nisha's play School, Goa
- Office building of the West Bengal Renewable Energy Development Agency, Kolkata
- Office-cum-laboratory for the West Bengal Pollution Control Board, Kolkata
- Silent Valley, Kalasa
- Vikas Apartments, Auroville
- La Cuisine Solaire, Auroville
- Kindergarten School, Auroville
- Visitors’ Centre, Auroville
- Computer Maintenance Corporation House, Mumbai
- Dormitory Building, Karjat

== See also ==
- Green building in India
- Energy Conservation Building Code
- Solar power in India
- India Environment Portal
- Energy-efficient buildings – a business case for India? An analysis of incremental costs for four building projects of the Energy-Efficient Homes Programme, 2015
