= Zhabdrung =

Zhabdrung (also Shabdrung):

- Zhabdrung - was a title used when referring to or addressing great lamas in Tibet, particularly those who held a hereditary lineage.
- Zhabdrung Ngawang Namgyal - was a Tibetan Buddhist lama and the unifier of Bhutan as a nation-state.
