= Gyalwang Mipham Wangpo =

Mipham Wangpo (Tibetan: མི་ཕམ་དབང་པོ, Wylie: mi pham dbang po, 1641–1717) was considered to be the immediate re-incarnation of Gyalwang Pagsam Wangpo and the sixth Gyalwang Drukchen hierarch of the Northern branch of the Drukpa Kagyu tradition of Tibetan Buddhism.

He was born at Phoding in Lhodrak, Kharchu district of southern Tibet and recognized by the 5th Dalai Lama as the Omniscient Drukchen incarnation. He spent most of his formative years at Lhasa in the Potala Palace of the Dalai Lama and studying at the monastic colleges of Sera, Drepung, and Gaden.

Mipham Wangpo was an influential figure in settling the Ladakh-Tibet war of 1679–1684.

== Alternate Names ==
- Mipham Wangpo (mi pham dbang po)
- Mipham Ngakgi Wangchuck (mi pham ngag gi dbang phyug)

.

== Sources ==
- Yoshiro Imaeda (2013). The Successors of Zhabdung Ngawang Namgyel. Thimphu: Riyang Books. p. 112. ISBN 978-99936-899-3-5.
