= Gyalwang Pagsam Wangpo =

5th Gyalwang Drukpa (1593–1653)

- Title: 5th Gyalwang Drukpa

Personal life
- Born: 1593 Chonggye, Tsang, southern Tibet
- Died: 1653 (aged 59–60)

Religious life
- Religion: Tibetan Buddhist
- School: Drukpa Lineage
- Lineage: Gyalwang Drukpa

Senior posting
- Teacher: Lhatsewa Ngawang Zangpo (lha rtse ba ngag dbang bzang po) (1546-1615)
- Period in office: 1597-1653
- Reincarnation: Kunkhyen Pema Karpo (1527-1592 CE)
- Students: Taktsang Repa, Dungkar Mipam Lodrö (1577-1636), Künga Lhündrup (1616-1675) Mipam Püntsok Shérap

Pagsam Wangpo (dpag bsam dbang po) (1593-1653 CE), a key figure in the history of the Drukpa Lineage of Tibetan Buddhism, was born at Chonggye ('phyong rgyas), in the Tsang province of Tibet a natural son of the prince of Chonggye, Ngawang Sonam Dragpa. He was an elder cousin of the 5th Dalai Lama, Ngawang Lobzang Gyatso (1617-1682).

Pagsam Wangpo was considered to be an immediate re-incarnation of Kunkhyen Pema Karpo (1527-1592 CE). In 1597 he was enthroned as the 5th Gyalwang Drukpa hierarch of the Northern branch of the Drukpa Lineage at Tashi Thongmon monastery, resulting in a lengthy dispute with a rival candidate enthroned at Ralung Monastery.

== Disputed Incarnation ==
Following a traditional paternal-uncle to nephew model of spiritual and temporal succession common in Tibet during that period known as khuwon (khu dbon), the Gya (rgya), also known as the Druk, family descended from Tsangpa Gyare (1161–1211) and his nephew Darma Senge (Wylie: dar ma seng+ge, 1177-1237) held both the main spiritual succession of the Central Drukpa (bar 'bruk) tradition as well as the temporal control of Ralung Monastery and its extensive estates for over 400 years. In English sources, this particular line of spiritual and temporal succession is often referred to as the hereditary lineage of the "prince-abbots" of Ralung.

The 13th hierarch of this Ralung succession, Kunga Penjor (Wylie: kun dga' dpal 'byor, 1428–1476) declared himself to be the reincarnation of the founder Tsangpa Gyare, thus becoming the 2nd Gyalwang Drukpa as well as the hereditary hierarch of Ralung. However, following his death, the Gya family had no male heir to assume the position of his reincarnation. Some of his students therefore looked outside of Gya clan in order to continue this incarnation line. Chödrak Gyatso, 7th Karmapa Lama (1454–1506) recognized Jamyang Chökyi Drakpa, a son of his patrons, the powerful Ja (Wylie: bya) clan, as the Third Gyalwang Drukpa.; Then following his death in 1523, a boy from the Kongpo region was recognized as his reincarnation and became the fourth Gyalwang Drukpa, Kunkhyen ("the omniscient") Padma Karpo, the greatest scholar in the history of the Drukpa school.

Meanwhile, Ngawang Chögyal (Wylie: ngag dbang chos rgyal, 1465-1540) the nephew of Drukpa Kunley and son of Kunga Paljor's brother Nangso Rinchen Zangpo (nang so rin chen bzang po) (also known as Lhawang), succeeded Kunga Paljor as the 14th hereditary prince-abbot of Ralung. He was succeeded by his elder son Ngawang Drakpa (1506–1530); who in turn was succeeded by his younger brother Ngagi Wangchuck (1517–1554); who was succeeded by his son Mipham Chögyal (1543–1606).

The Central Drukpa school thus became effectively split into two, one group following the incarnation line of the Gyalwang Drukpas and another following the old hereditary Drukpa lineage of the prince abbots of Ralung monastery.

Following the death of the Kunkhyen Pema Karpo in 1592, two candidates were claimed as his reincarnation: Pagsam Wangpo (b. 1593), the natural son of the prince of Chongye, and Ngawang Namgyal (b.1594), the son of Mipham Chögyal, 17th prince-abbot of Ralung. The arbitrage between the parties of the two candidates was long and complex, involving most of the principal religious and political dignitaries of Tibet at that time. Lhatsewa Ngawang Zangpo (lha rtse ba ngag dbang bzang po, 1546–1615), an influential follower of Gyalwang Drukpa Padma Karpo, and most of the monks of Tashi Thongmon and Druk Sangag Chöling monasteries, favoured Lhatsewa's nephew, Pagsam Wangpo; while the Gya clan of Ralung Monastery, the traditional seat of the Drukpa school, and their supporters laid claim on behalf of Ngawang Namgyal. The long dispute ultimately led to a decision by the strongman of Tibet, Karma Phuntsok Namgyal, who chose the Chonggye candidate Pagsam Wangpo. This cemented the split of the central branch of the Drukpa school into Northern and Southern branches, and the flight of the opposing candidate to the south of the Himalayas where he established an independent Drukpa state now known as Bhutan.

== Teachers ==
The principal teachers of Pagsam Wangpo were:

- Lhatsewa Ngawang Zangpo (lha rtse ba ngag dbang bzang po) (1546–1615) - his uncle, who was an important disciple of Padma Karpo.
- Rinchen Palzang (rin chen dpal bzang) (1537-1609/1617)
- Jampal Drakpa ('jam dpal grags pa) (1546-1615)
- Khewang Sangey Dorje (mkhas dbang sangs rgyas rdo rje) (1569-1645) - disciple of Padma Karpo and a major writer of the Drukpa school.
- Lhawang Drakpa (lha dbang grags pa) (born 16th century) - a scholar of the Jonang tradition of the Kalacakra and important master of the Shangpa Kagyu tradition.
- Rigdzin Jatson Nyingpo ('ja' tshon snying po) (1585-1656) - an important Nyingma terton who had a major influence on several branches of the Kagyu tradition.

== Disciples ==
Among the many disciples of Pagsam Wangpo notable were:

- the yogi Taktsang Repa, who was invited by the ruler Sangay Namgyal (1570-1642)to Ladakh where they restored and re-established Hemis Monastery;
- Dungkar Mipam Lodrö (mi pham blo gros) (1577-1636)
- Künga Lhündrup (kun dga' lhun grub) (1616-1675)
- Mipam Püntsok Shérap (mi pham phun tshogs shes rab)
- the 1st Khamtrul Rinpoche, Karma Tenphel (ka.rma bstan 'phel)(1569-1627/37) who established the Khampagar Monastery in eastern Tibet; and his student the 1st Dzigar Choktrul Rinpoche Sönam Gyamtso (bsod nams rgya mtsho) (1608–1669) who founded the Dzigar Monastery in the Chamdo region.

== Biographies ==
Tibetan Namthar:
Note: Namthar contain accounts of the external life and interior realizations of great masters of the Tibetan tradition written in a reverential or hagiographical tone.

- dpal rgyas dbang po (2001). dpal 'brug pa rin po che rgyal dbang thams cad mkhyen pa dpag bsam dbang po thub bstan yongs 'du'i dpal gyi sde'i rnam par thar pa skal bzang kun tu dga' ba'i zlos gar [Biography of a master of the Drugpa Kargyu tradition, the Sixth Drugchen Pagsam Wangpo (1593-1641); written by the professional biographer Palgye Wangpo] (in Tibetan). Darjeeling: 'brug sgar dpe mdzod khang.
- gyal dbang 'brug chen dpag bsam dbang po dang mi pham dbang po'i rnam thar [Namthar of Gyalwang Pagsam Wangpo and Gyalwang Mipam Wangpo] (in Tibetan). Darjeeling: kargyud sungrab nyamso khang. 1974.
- 'phrin las rgya mtsho (2009) [1845]. dpag bsam dbang po'i rnam thar [Namthar of Pagsam Wangpo] (in Tibetan). Plouray: Drukpa Plouray. pp. 240–253. LCCN 2009312201.
