= Kung Fu Nuns =

Order of Buddhist nuns in the Drukpa Lineage

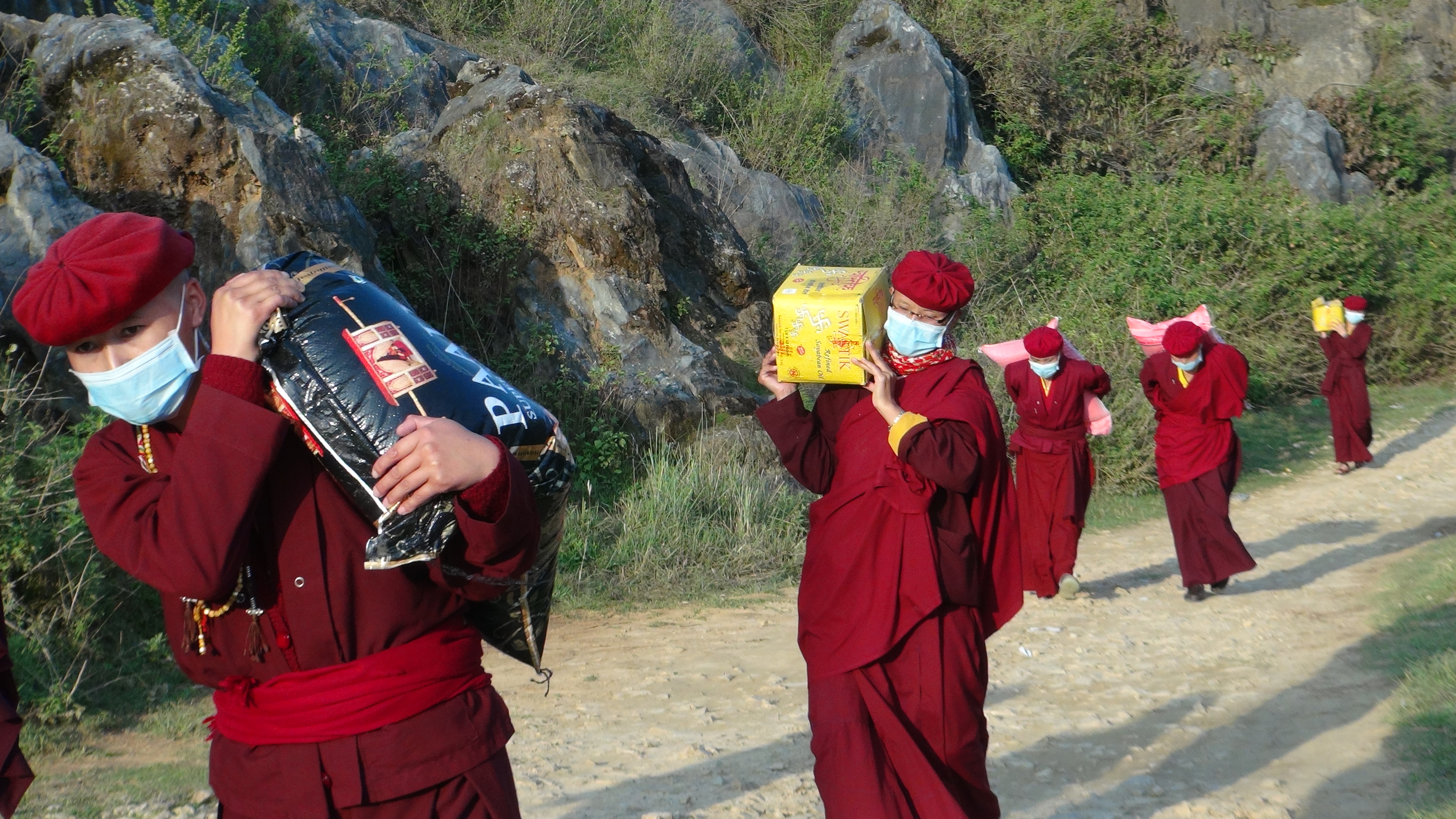
A group of Kung Fu Nuns carry supplies to villages affected by the 2015 Nepal earthquakes.

The Kung Fu Nuns (or 'Kung Fu Nuns of Nepal') are an order of Buddhist nuns who belong to the Drukpa Kagyu lineage, a thousand-year-old sect led by the Gyalwang Drukpa. Their name comes from the order's proficiency in Chinese martial arts, which they began learning in 2008 after the 12th Gyalwang Drukpa authorised training for them despite centuries-old Buddhist laws banning exercise for nuns.

The Drukpa nuns are best known for their social activism and humanitarian work. They also occupy leadership roles in their nunneries, performing basic trades and management skills.

== Origin ==
The Kung Fu Nuns began to grow in rank when the Gyalwang Drukpa sought ways to expand opportunities for them after becoming frustrated with women's lack of access to educational opportunities and equal treatment in the region. "If the girl has no opportunity, then even the parents think that the girl is useless," the Gyalwang Drukpa told Global Citizen in 2017, reacting to a human trafficking epidemic that has swept the Himalayan region. "[They say,] 'I have a baby girl, so I have to sell it.'"

Contravening centuries of the Buddhist tradition, the Gyalwang Drukpa hired a Vietnamese kung fu master and ten nuns in 2008 to teach them the art and help build the nuns' self-confidence. They train regularly and most have achieved black belts. Jigme Yanching Kamu, a nun since she was ten, told CNN's Great Big Story in the summer of 2019, that "Kung Fu trains us to focus our minds for meditation."

== Self-sustaining ==
All the nuns have the same first name, Jigme, which is Tibetan for "fearless one". The nuns are taught to drive, lead prayer, and many trades skills – including plumbing, typing, cycling, solar panel installation and the English language. In 2010, they rebuilt their road up Druk Amitabha Mountain for the second time, serving not only the nunnery but the Live to Love-built eye clinic and the nearby village of Ramkot.

After the 2015 earthquake, the nunnery was as devastated as the rest of Kathmandu Valley. The sisters repaired solar panels, laid new tiles in the front yard, and rebuilt their broken compound wall while still traveling to remote sites to help villagers recover.

The order now has about 800 sisters, ranging in age from 8 to 80, in four nunneries:

- Druk Gawa Khilwa, Kathmandu, on Druk Amitabha Mountain, is the main training center and currently, the administrative headquarters of all the nunneries in the Himalayas
- Druk Gawa Khilwa, Kortsa, located in a remote mountainous area in Ladakh – the main retreat centers for the nuns
- Druk Gawa Khilwa, Shey, Ladakh, occupying the Naropa Palace (Naro Phodrang) in the compound of the Druk White Lotus School (also known as Druk Padma Karpo Institute) – one of the practice centers to support the locals and school children in their daily spiritual practice and development
- Druk Gawa Khilwa, Lahaul, a practice centre to support locals in their spiritual practice and development

== Humanitarian Work ==
The Drukpa nuns are community activists, promoting gender equality, environmental sustainability, and intercultural tolerance in their home villages in the Himalayas, where women's access to educational and economic opportunities are some of the lowest in the world. Prompted by the Gyalwang Drukpa's belief that community service is a key part of religious faith and practice, the nuns have played an active role in regional relief efforts, promoting awareness about human trafficking, and working to preach and practice environmentally sustainable lifestyles. They also operate health care clinics – offering free eye care camps to villagers – and rescue stray and wounded animals throughout the region.

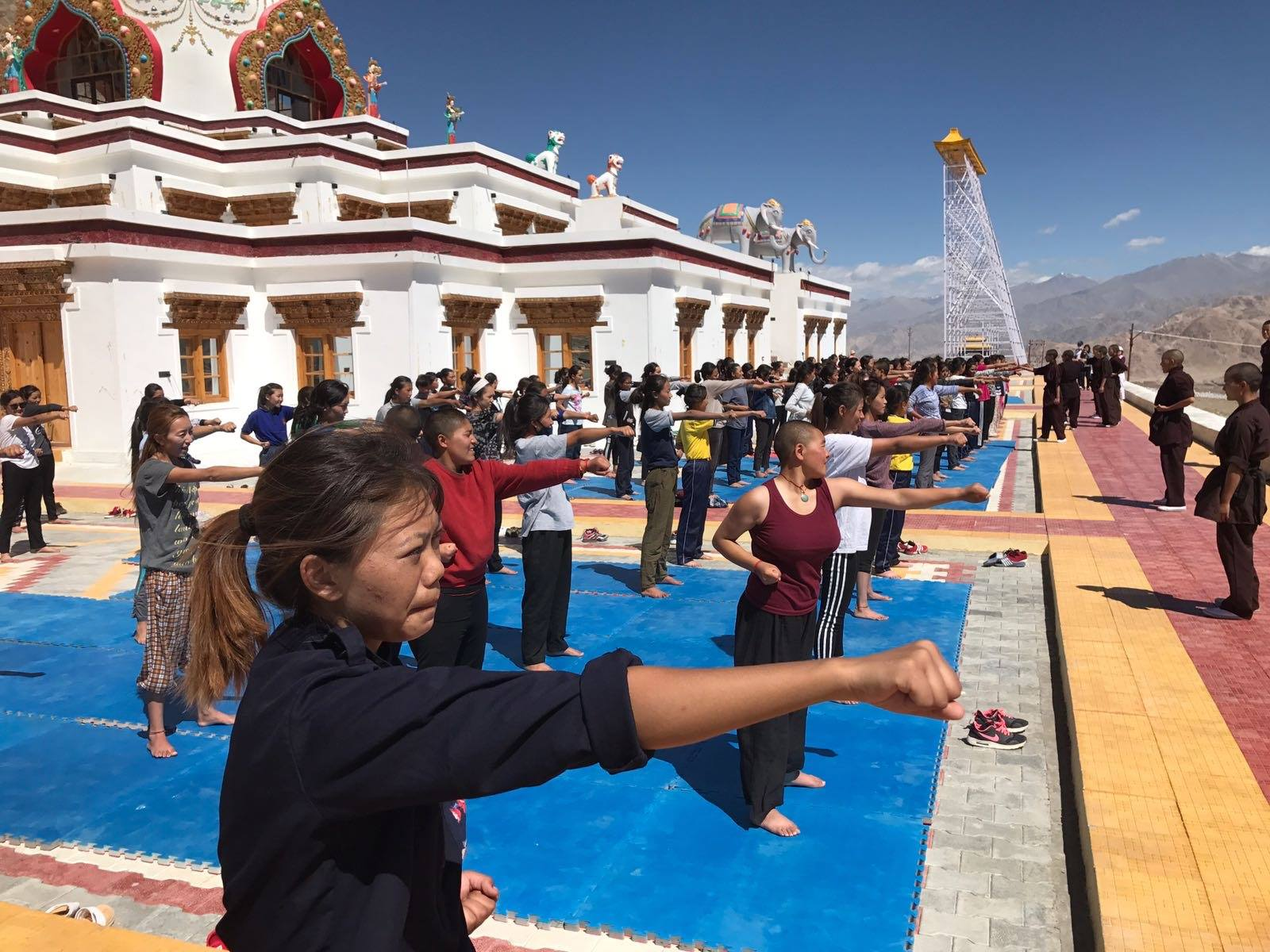
The Kung Fu Nuns teach a group of women at their August 2017 defense training in Ladakh, India.

After the 2015 Gorkha Earthquake, the nuns trekked from Amitabha Monastery in Kathmandu to nearby villages to remove rubble, salvage villagers' possessions, and clear pathways. They also delivered food and medical aid to affected villagers. Many of these villages were inaccessible to traditional relief organizations and government aid. According to the humanitarian nonprofit Live to Love International, with which the nuns collaborate on relief and conservation projects, the nuns delivered 3000 tons of rice and 500 tons of milk to affected villagers and built 10,000 temporary shelters across the region.

The Kung Fu Nuns have assisted Waterkeeper Alliance in its work to ensure access to clean fresh water in the Himalayas. Over 200 nuns serve as volunteer water quality monitors, part of a larger network of Waterkeeper organizations and affiliates that seek to spread awareness about the importance of the Himalayan Glacier and its rivers. Waterkeeper Alliance trains individuals and groups to collect and communicate these water quality metrics that are then used by the organization to press for watershed protection.

The sisters form a significant part of the spiritual entourage of the Gyalwang Drukpa, who leads annual "Eco Pad Yatras" – holy pilgrimages that also allow the nuns and other walkers to clean up toxic waste and dangerous plastic litter that is polluting fresh water in the Himalayan villages. The nuns visit villages on other occasions to speak about the importance of recycling and reducing dependence on plastic.

In 2017, the Kung Fu Nuns hosted their first-ever self-defense training, which they organized for Himalayan women after an increase in sex attacks in India. According to the Indian National Crime Records Bureau, more than 34,000 rapes were reported in India in 2015, a 43% increase since 2011. Seeing an opportunity to assist women in India who felt increasingly threatened in public, the nuns hosted nearly 100 women from their early teens to young adulthood to teach them effective self-defense skills at Hemis Monastery in Ladakh. The nuns hosted the second self-defence workshop with Live to Love India in July 2018.

== Bicycle yatras for human trafficking prevention ==
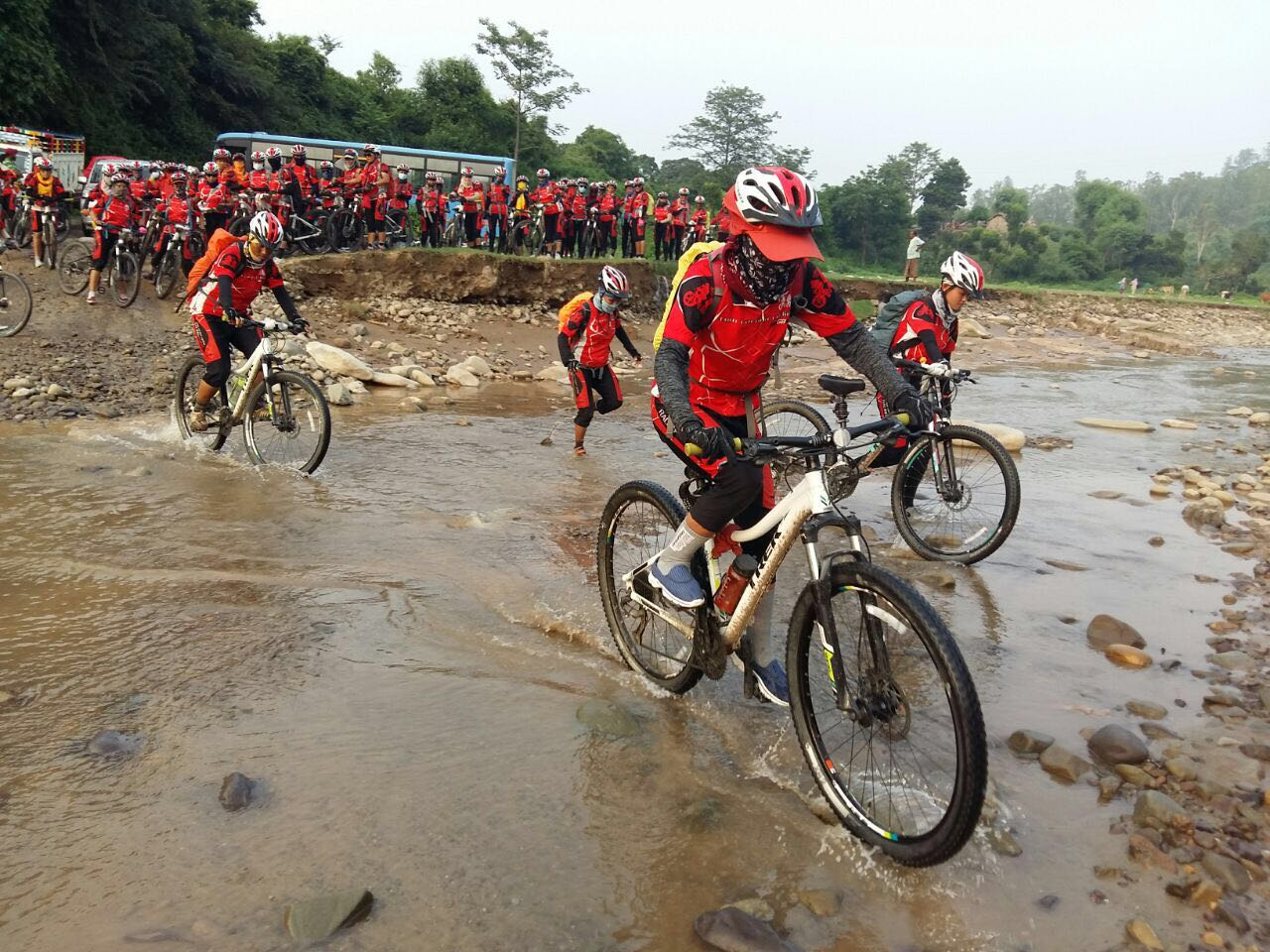
The 2016 Bicycle Yatra led by His Holiness the Gyalwang Drukpa and the Kung Fu Nuns

The Kung Fu Nuns gained international attention in 2016 when they completed a 5000-kilometer round trip bicycle journey – called a yatra ("pilgrimage") – through the Himalayas from Kathmandu, Nepal to Ladakh. In each village, they stopped to lead prayer, discuss the importance of environmental sustainability, and promote women's empowerment in the wake of a 15% increase in human trafficking cases following the April 2015 Nepal earthquake. The nuns – and the Gyalwang Drukpa – received special permission from the Indian government to travel through Kashmir, which was experiencing heightened border tensions at the time. In these villages, the nuns preached the value of non-violence, interfaith tolerance, and peace.

In 2018, the Kung Fu Nuns completed a second bicycle yatra since the increase in human trafficking after the earthquake, and their fifth in total. The route took them 3000 miles from Nepal through South India to Delhi and finally Darjeeling.

== Awards and recognition ==
The Drukpa nuns were invited to London in 2012 for Kung Fu demonstrations as part of that year's pre-Olympic celebrations. A small team performed kata and stickwork for appreciative audiences.

In 2017, the Kung Fu Nuns were invited to speak and perform at the Reuters Trust Conference, where they demonstrated their work and spoke about their efforts to achieve gender equality in their home region.

The Kung Fu Nuns received the Asia Society's Asia Game Changer Award in New York City on 24 October 2019.

== See also ==
- Ladakh Nuns Association
- Ladakh Buddhist Association
