= Kunkhyen Pema Karpo =

4th Gyalwang Drukpa (1527-1592)

- ཀུན་མཁྱེན་པདྨ་དཀར་པོ་
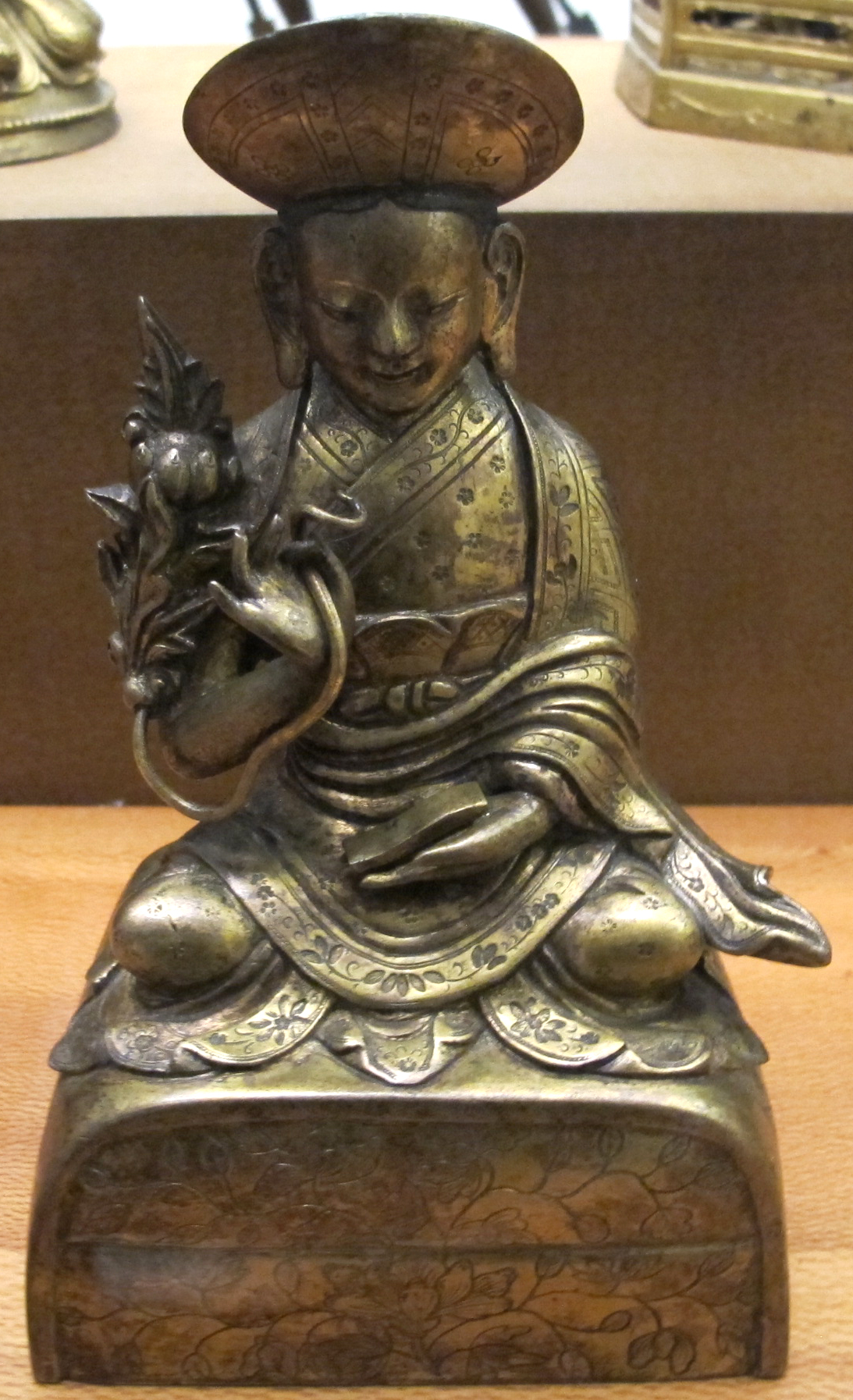
- Pema Karpo
- Title: Gyalwang Drukpa

Personal life
- Born: 1527
- Died: 1592 (aged 64–65)

Religious life
- Religion: Buddhist

Kunkhyen Pema Karpo (Tibetan: ཀུན་མཁྱེན་པདྨ་དཀར་པོ་, Wylie: kun-mkhyen pad-ma dkar-po) (1527–1592 CE) was the fourth Gyalwang Drukpa, head of the Drukpa lineage of Tibetan Buddhism. He was the most famous and learned of all the Gyalwang Drukpas. During his lifetime, he was known as the grand lama amongst all grand lamas, and was a teacher to many lamas and disciples all over Tibet.

Pema Karpo authored twenty-four volumes writing on philosophy, logic, literature, history, and astrology which have since formed a widely studied corpus of work. He is also quite famous for his writings on Mahamudra. He founded Druk Sangag Choeling monastery at Jar in southern Tibet, establishing it as the new seat of the Drukpa lineage.

This omniscient master was the first Gyalwang Drukpa to concoct the famous enlightenment pill known as Ja-Tsukma, utilizing esoteric ingredients offered by the dakinis. Before he died, Pema Karpo promised that he would have two incarnations to propagate the spiritual teachings. In accordance with this prophecy, two incarnations were discovered.

== Texts ==
- Practice Guidelines of the Simultaneous School of Mahamudra
- The Oral transmission of the Six Cycles of Same Taste: Rolled into a ball [Path walking] instructions
- A Casket of Sacred Dharma: Stages of Meditation on Dependent Arising
- Commentary on the Bodhicharyavatara

== Trivia ==
The multi-award winning Druk White Lotus School in Shey, Ladakh, is named after him.

== Monasteries ==
Important monasteries of the Drukpa order include:

- Ralung Monastery in central Tibet just north of Bhutan
- Druk Sangag Choeling Monastery
- Hemis Monastery
- Thimphu Dzong, which houses the Central Monk Body of Bhutan in summer
- Punakha Dzong, the winter home of the Central Monk Body
- Namdruk Monastery
