= Ralung Monastery =

Tibetan Buddhist monastery in Gyantse County, Tibet, China

Coordinates: 28.8347°N 90.0997°E

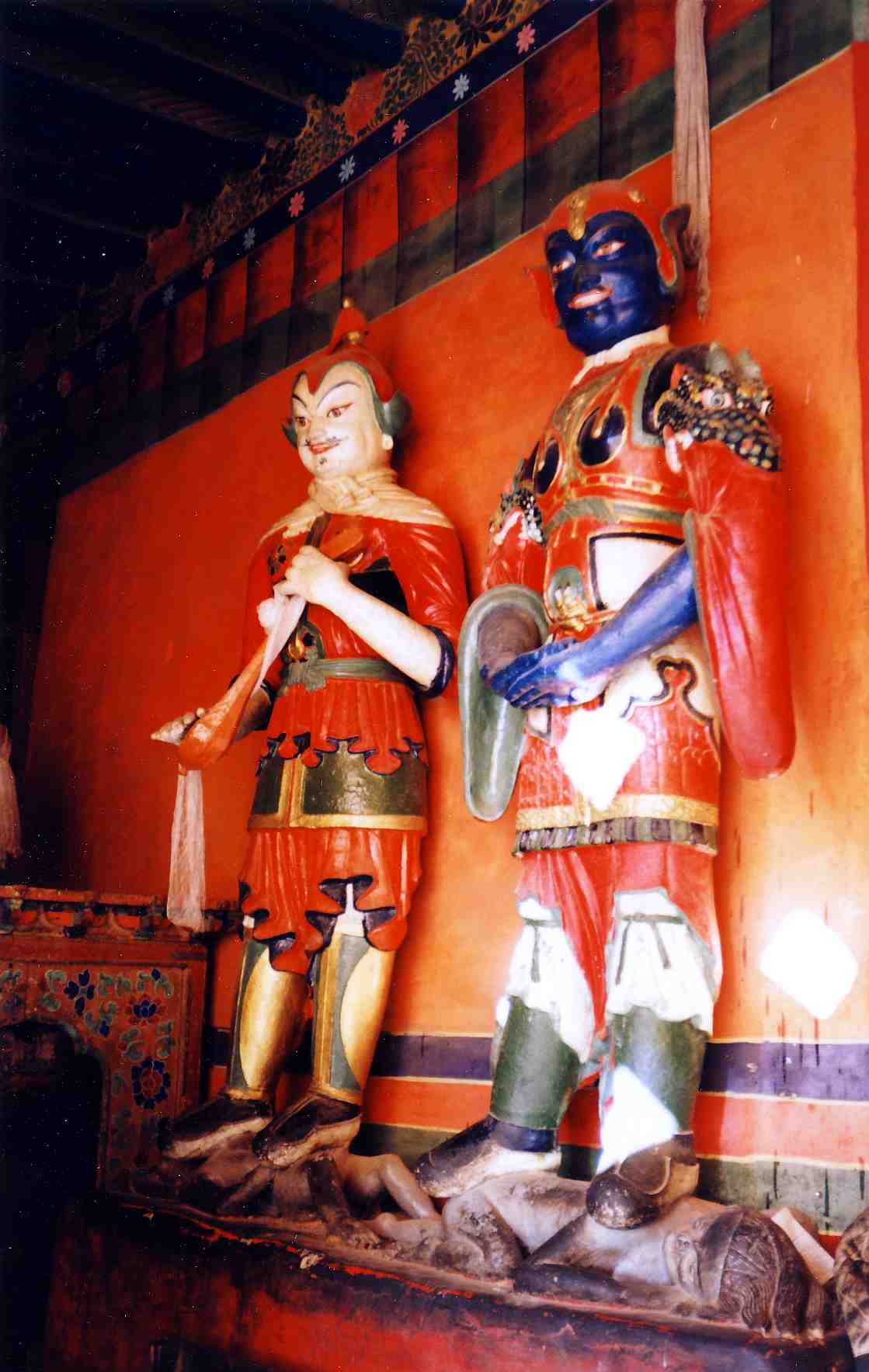
Protective deities at Ralung Monastery, 1993.

Ralung Monastery (Wylie: ra lung dgon), located in the Tsang region of western Tibet south of Karo Pass, is the traditional seat of the Drukpa Lineage of Tibetan Buddhism. It was founded in 1180 by Tsangpa Gyare, 1st Gyalwang Drukpa, a disciple of Lingje Répa (Wylie: gling rje ras pa) who founded the Drukpa Lineage.

Ralung is one of the most sacred places in Tibet, for it is here that the great Dugpa school of red-hat monks originated, a school still influential with numerous adherents in Southern, Northern, and Eastern Tibet, and in Bhutan, which latter country is, in fact, called Dugpa owing to the preponderance of this sect. The Ralung-til, the head monastery of the Dugpa, is to the south-east of this village. This monastery owes its name to the fact that it is surrounded by mountains as the heart (mt'il) of a lotus is by the corolla.

== Location ==
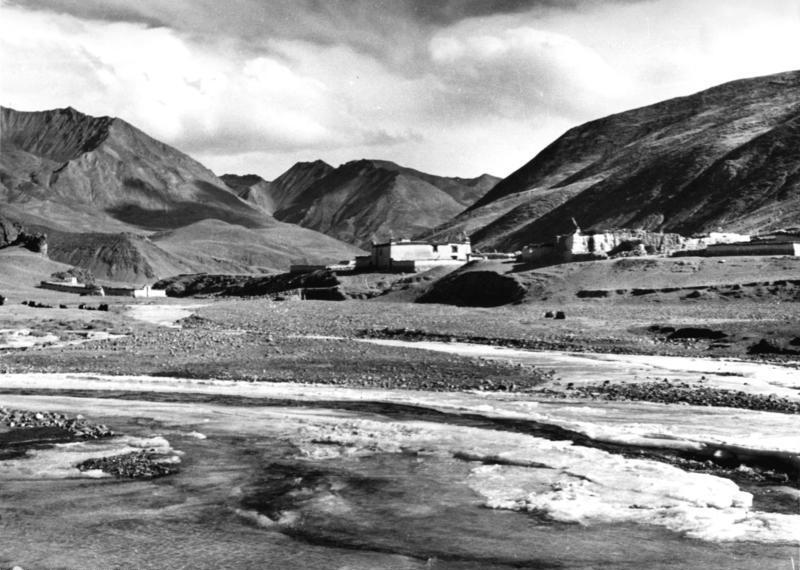
Ralung Gompa. 1938.

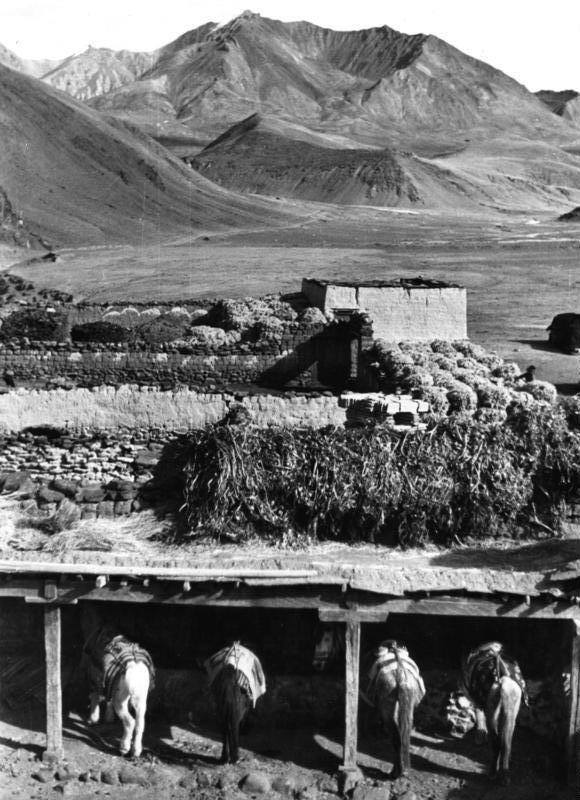
Horse stable. Ralung. 1938.

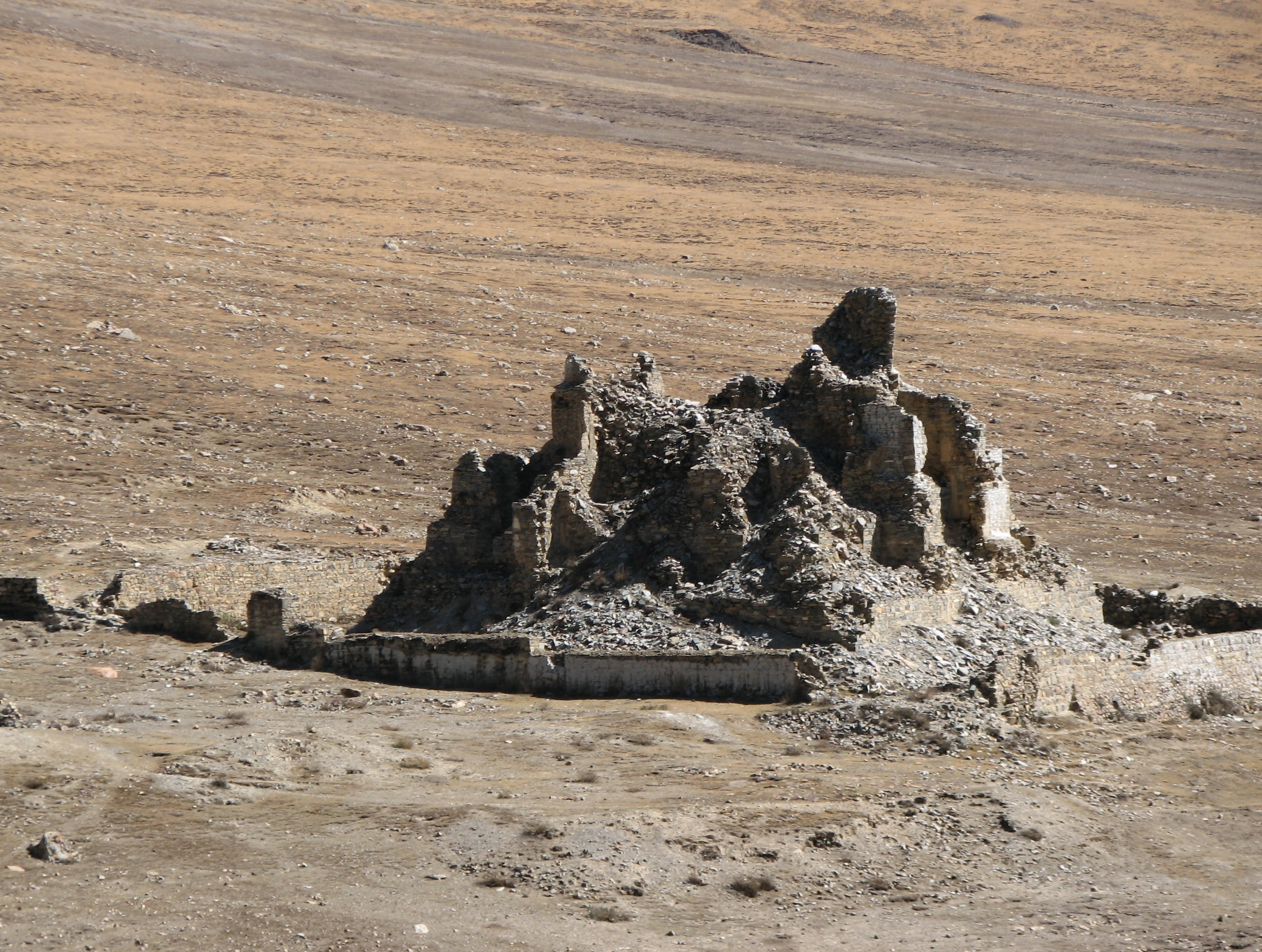
Ruins of part of Ralung Gompa in 2015

The monastery is located in present-day Gyantse County several kilometers south of the road connecting Nakartse and Lungmar, immediately north of the Gasa district of Bhutan. In previous times, trade could be conducted across the Yak La pass across the high Himalayas, extending the influence of Ralung to the south.

The monastery is surrounded by the towering peaks and glacier fields of Gyetong Soksum (6,244m), Jangzang Lhamo (6,324m) and Nojin Gangzang (7,191m). From the beginning the location was recognized as especially auspicious:

The eight auspicious symbols adorned the surrounding: The mountain in front of the monastery appeared in the form of a white conch turning clock-wise; the peak of Rala pass appeared like a precious open parasol; the peak behind Pokya appeared like a brimming vase; the Tsenchu peak appeared like a victory banner hoisted high; the Yangon hill appeared like a pair of golden fish; the ground at Gormo appeared like a golden wheel; the hill in the direction of Penthang appeared like an open lotus stem with the twin streams appearing like two birds facing each other; and Gyamo meadow appeared like an auspicious knot.

== History ==
The founder of Bhutan, the first Zhabdrung Rinpoche, Ngawang Namgyal, was the 18th abbot of Ralung Monastery. In 1616, he fled Tibet when his recognition as the reincarnation of renowned scholar Kunkhyen Pema Karpo was challenged by the governor of Tsang province. Ngawang Namgyal unified the warring valleys of Bhutan, fending off attacks from Tibet, forming a national identity and establishing a dual system of government that continues to this day in modified form as the Royal Government of Bhutan.

== Palden Drukpa lineage ==
Chart of the hereditary Palden Drukpa lineage (Tibetan: དཔལ་ལྡན་འབྲུག་པའི་གདུང་བརྒྱུད་) of Ralung from the founder, Tsangpa Gyare, to the last hereditary throne holder, Ngawang Namgyal. Successive throne holders are numbered with their names in bold text.

Family of Ralung Monastery

Gya Zurpo Tsape
Kalden	Lhanyen	Lhabum	Mangtsen	Jotsul	Gomped	**1. Tsangpa Gyare** (Note: Tsangpa Gyare (gtsang pa rgya ras ye shes rdo rje, b.1161-d.1211))
2. **Dharma Senggé** (Note: Dharma Senggé Sanggyé Wönré (dhar ma seng ge sangs rgyas dbon res, b.1177-d.1237))	Lhatsen	Chogo
3. **Zhönnu Senggé** (Note: Zhönnu Senggé (gzhon nu seng ge, b.1200-d.1266))	Rinchen Pel	Lopon Ontag
4. **Nyima Senggé** (Note: Nyima Senge (nyi ma seng ge, b.1251-d.1287))	DL Senge Sherab	5. **Senggé Rinchen** (Note: Pökyapa Senggé Rinchen (spos skya pa seng ge rin chen) (b.1258- d. 1313))
6. **Senggé Gyelpo** (Note: Senggé Gyelpo (seng ge rgyal po, b.1289-d.1326))
7. **Jamyang Künga Senggé** (Note: Jamyang Künga Senggé ('jam dbyangs kun dga' seng ge, b.1289-d.1326))
8. **Lodrö Senggé** (Note: Lodrö Senggé (blo gros seng ge, b.1345-d.1390) -)
9. **Shérap Senggé** (Note: Shérap Senggé (shes rab seng ge, b.1371-d.1392))	10. **Yeshe Rinchen** (Note: Yeshe Rinchen (ye shes rin chen))
11. **Namkha Pelzang** (Note: Namkha Pelzang (nam mkha' dpal bzang, b.1398-d.1425))	12. **Shérap Zangpo** (Note: Sherab Zangpo (shes rab bzang po) (b.1400-d.1425))	Dorje Gyalpo
13. **Künga Penjor** (Note: Künga Penjor (kun dga' dpal 'byor, 1428–1476) – Drukchen II)	Lhawang	Rinchen Zangpo
14. **Ngawang Chögyel** (Note: Ngawang Chögyel (ngag dbang chos rgyal, b.1465-d.1540))	Drukpa Kunleg
Ngawang Dragpa	15. **Ngak gi Wangchuk** (Note: Ngak gi Wangchuk Drakpa Gyeltsen (ngag gi dbang phyug grags pa rgyal mtshan, b.1517-d.1554))	Ngawang Tenzin
16. **Mipam Chögyel** (Note: Mipam Chögyel (mi pham chos rgyal, b.1543-d.1604))	Tsewang Tenzin
17. **Mipam Tenpé Nyima** (Note: Mipam Tenpé Nyima (mi pham bstan pa'i nyi ma, b.1567-d.1619))	Tenzin Rabgye
18. **Ngawang Namgyal** (Note: Ngawang Namgyal (zhabs drung ngag dbang rnam rgyal, b.1594-d.1651))
Jampal Dorje

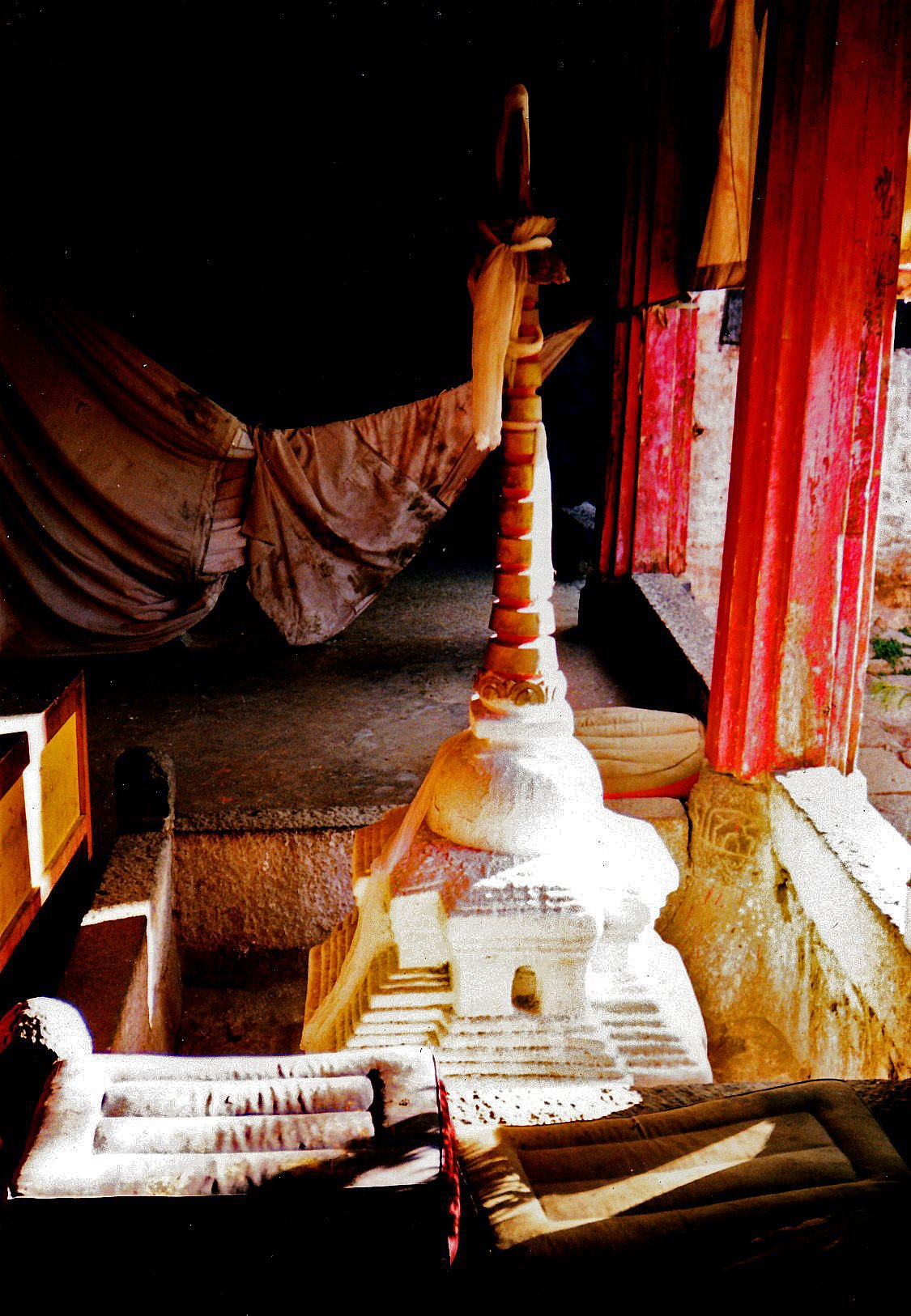
Torma (butter sculpture). Ralung Gompa, Tibet. 1993

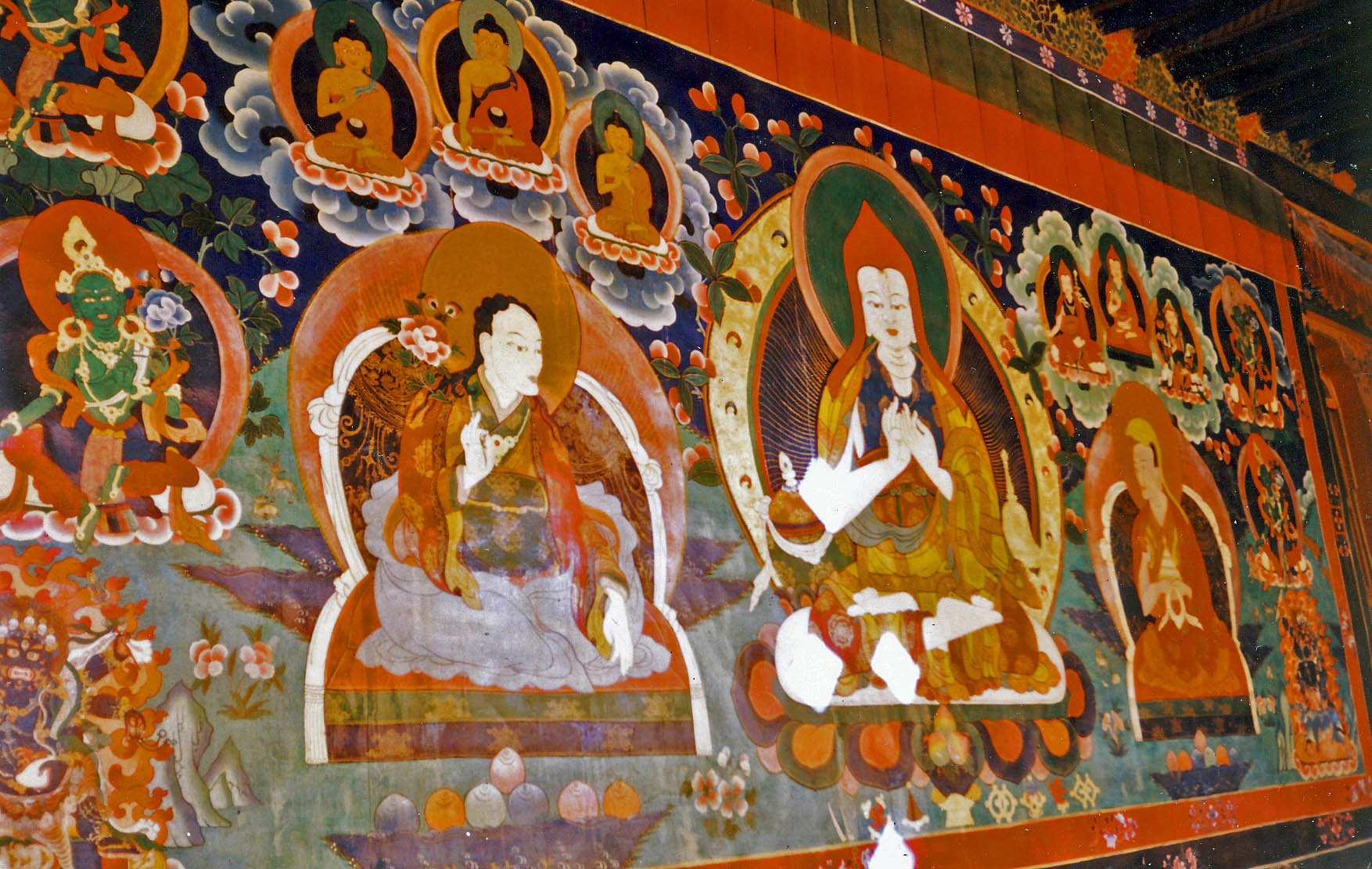
Mural showing Atisha at Ralung Gompa, 1993.
