= Drukpa Kagyu =

School of Tibetan Buddhism

Gyalwang Drukpa of Drukpa Lineage
- རྒྱལ་དབང་འབྲུག་པ་
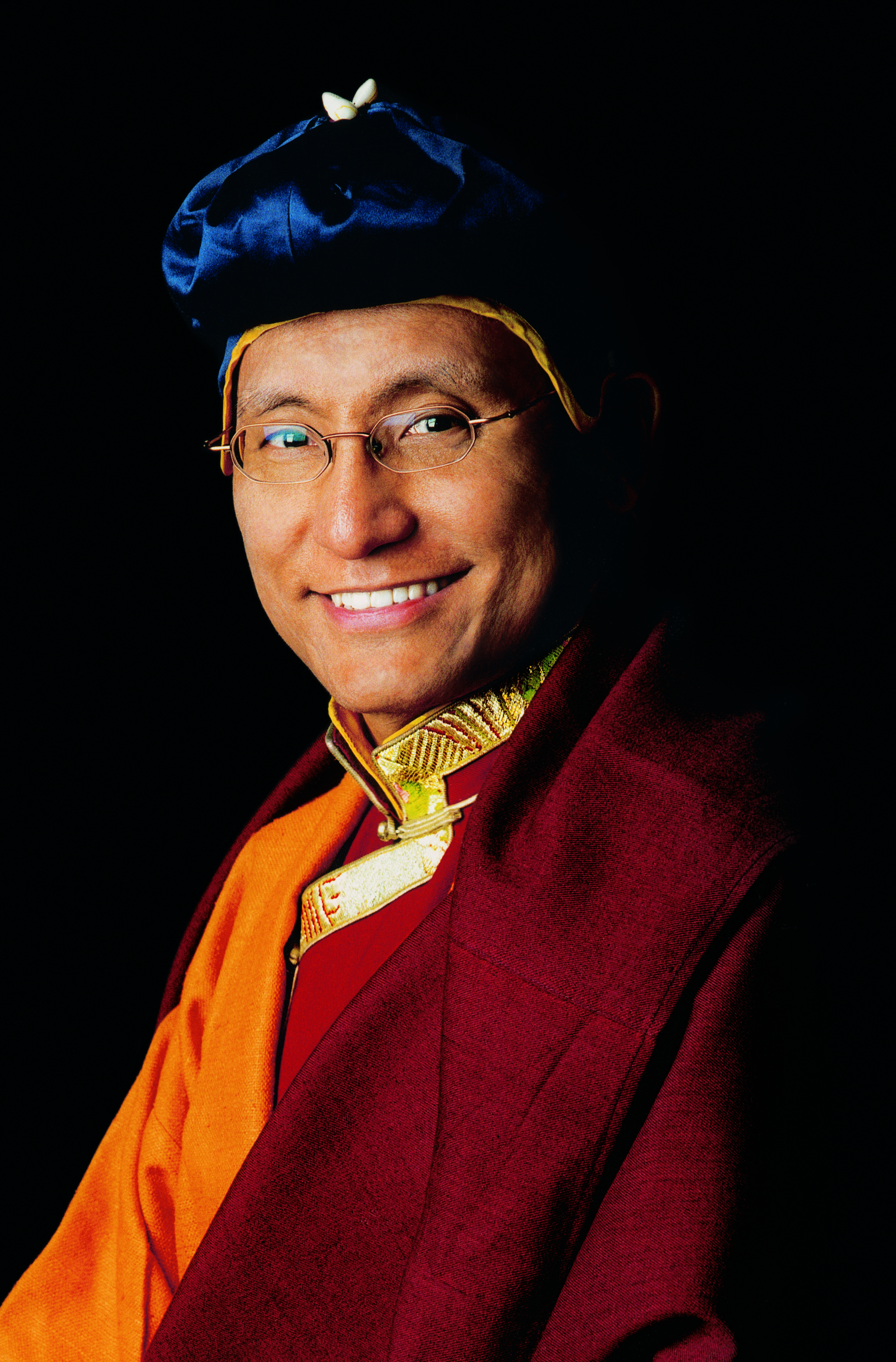
- Incumbent; Jigme Pema Wangchen since 1963
- First holder: Drogon Tsangpa Gyare

The Drukpa or Drukpa Kagyu (Dzongkha: འབྲུག་པ་བཀའ་བརྒྱུད) lineage, sometimes called Dugpa in older sources, is a branch of the Kagyu school of Tibetan Buddhism. The Kagyu school is one of the Sarma or "New Translation" schools of Tibetan Buddhism. The Drukpa lineage was founded in the Tsang region of Tibet by Tsangpa Gyare (1161–1211), and later became influential in Ladakh and Bhutan. It is one of several lineages known as "Red Hat sects".

Within the Drukpa lineage, there are further sub-schools, most notably the eastern Kham tradition and middle Drukpa school which prospered in Ladakh and surrounding areas. In Bhutan the Drukpa lineage is the dominant school and state religion.

The Gyalwang Drukpa (Dzongkha: རྒྱལ་དབང་འབྲུག་པ་) is the honorific title of the head of the Drukpa Kagyu lineage. The first Gyalwang Drukpa and founder of the school was Tsangpa Gyare. The 12th Gyalwang Drukpa, Jigme Pema Wangchen, is the current lineage holder.

== History ==
The Drukpa Lineage was founded in the Tsang region of Tibet by Tsangpa Gyare (1161–1211), a disciple of Ling Repa. He mastered the Vajrayana practices of mahamudra and the Six Yogas of Naropa at an early age. As a tertön (finder of spiritual treasures), Tsangpa Gyare is said to have discovered the text of the Six Equal Tastes, which had been concealed by Rechung Dorje Drakpa, a principal disciple of Milarepa.

According to traditional accounts, while Tsangpa Gyare and his disciples were on a pilgrimage, nine dragons (Wylie: 'brug) emerged from the earth and soared into the sky as flowers rained down. This event was interpreted as an auspicious sign, and the lineage was thereafter named Drukpa, meaning "Lineage of the Dragon."

Tsangpa Gyare was recognized as the Bodhisattva of Great Compassion Avalokiteśvara in human form, as well as an incarnation of the first Buddhist King of Tibet, Songtsän Gampo, of the great saint Naropa and of Milarepa's sun-like disciple Gampopa.

Important teachers in the early transmission of the lineage include Tsangpa Gyare's root guru, Ling Repa, and Ling Repa's teacher, Phagmo Drupa Dorje Gyalpo, who was a foremost disciple of Gampopa. Some traditions also note the influence of Dampa Sumpa, regarded as one of Rechung Dorje Drakpa's main disciples.

A notable disciple of Onre Darma Sengye, nephew of Tsangpa Gyare, was Phajo Drugom Zhigpo (1208–1276). In 1222, Phajo Drugom Zhigpo journeyed to western Bhutan, where he established the Drukpa Kagyu teachings and laid the foundations for the later spread of the lineage in the region.

=== Branches ===
The disciples of Tsangpa Gyare Yeshi Dorje (1161–1211), the first Gyalwang Drukpa, may be divided into two categories: blood relatives and spiritual sons. His nephew, Onre Darma Sengye (1177–1237), ascended the throne at Ralung, the main seat of the Drukpa lineage. Darma Sengye guided the later disciples of Tsangpa Gyare, such as Gotsangpa Gonpo Dorje (1189–1258), onto the path of realization, thus becoming their guru as well. Darma Sengye's nephew and their descendants held the seat at Ralung and continued the lineage.

Gyalwa Lorepa, Gyalwa Gotsangpa and his disciple Gyalwa Yang Gonpa, are known as Gyalwa Namsum or the Three Victorious Ones in recognition of their spiritual realization. The followers of Gyalwa Lorepa came to be called the 'Lower Drukpas'. The followers of Gyalwa Gotsangpa came to be called the 'Upper Drukpas'. And the followers of Onre Darma Sengye came to be called the 'Middle Drukpas'.

After the death of 4th Gyalwang Drukpa, Kunkhyen Pema Karpo, in 1592, there were two rival candidates for his reincarnation. Gyalwang Pagsam Wangpo, one of the candidates, was favored by the King of Tsang and prevailed. His rival, Ngawang Namgyal, was then invited to Western Bhutan and eventually he unified the entire country and established Drukpa as the preeminent Buddhist school from Haa all the way to Trongsa.

The Drukpa lineage was divided from that time on into the Northern Drukpa (Dzongkha: བྱང་འབྲུག་, Wylie: byang 'brug) branch in Tibet headed by the Gyalwang Drukpa and the Southern Drukpa (Dzongkha: ལྷོ་འབྲུག་, Wylie: lho 'brug) based in Bhutan and headed by the Zhabdrung incarnations. Ever since Zhabdrung Ngawang Namgyal appointed Pekar Jungne as the 1st Je Khenpo, the spiritual head of all monasteries in Bhutan, successive Je Khenpos have acted to date as spiritual regents of Bhutan.

=== Sub-schools ===
Several of Tsangpa Gyare's students started sub-schools, the most important of which were the Lower Drukpa founded by Gyalwa Lorepa Wangchug Tsondru and the Upper Drukpa founded by Gyalwa Gotsangpa Gonpo Dorje. This branch further gave rise to several important sub-schools. However the chief monasteries and succession of Gyalwang Drukpa Tsangpa Gyare passed to his nephew, Önre Darma Senge, at Ralung Monastery; this lineage was known as the Central Drukpa. This lineage of hereditary "prince-abbots" of Ralung continued until 1616, when Ngawang Namgyal, the Zhabdrung Rinpoche, fled to Bhutan due to a dispute over the incarnation of the 4th Gyalwang Drukpa and the enmity of the Tsangpa ruler. Due to those events, the Central Drukpa split into the Southern Drukpa led by the Zhabdrung and his successors in Bhutan and the Northern Drukpa led by Gyalwang Pagsam Wangpo and the successive Gyalwang Drukpa tulkus in Tibet.

==== Lower Drukpa ====
The Lower Drukpa (Wylie: smad 'brug) was founded by Tsangpa Gyare's disciple Loré Wangchuk Tsöndrü (Wylie: lo ras dbang phyug brtson 'grus, 1187–1250). Lorepa built the Üri (Wylie: dbu ri) and Sengeri (Wylie: seng ge ri) monasteries and visited Bhutan, where he founded Tharpaling Monastery (Wylie: thar pa gling) in Jakar. A special transmission of the Lower Drukpa lineage is known as The Five Capabilities (Wylie: thub pa lnga), which are:

1. Being capable of [facing] death: capability of Mahāmudrā (Wylie: phyag rgya chen-po 'chi thub)
2. Being capable of [wearing only] the cotton cloth: capability of tummo (Wylie: gtum mo ras thub)
3. Being capable of the tantric activities done in seclusion (Wylie: gsang spyod kyi ri thub)
4. Being capable of [facing] the disturbances of 'don spirits: sickness (Wylie: nad 'don gyi 'khrug thub)
5. Being capable of [facing] circumstances: capability of [applying] antidotes (Wylie: gnyen-po rkyen thub-pa)

==== Upper Drukpa ====
The Upper Drukpa (Wylie: stod 'brug) was founded Tsangpa Gyare's disciple Götsangpa Gönpo Dorjé (Wylie: rgod tshang pa mgon po rdo rje, 1189–1258), a highly realized yogi who had many disciples. His main disciples were Orgyenpa Rinchenpel (Wylie: o rgyan pa rin chen dpal, 1230—1309), Yanggönpa (Wylie: yang dgon pa), Chilkarpa (Wylie: spyil dkar pa) and Neringpa.

Orgyenpa, who was also a disciple of Karma Pakshi, 2nd Karmapa Lama, became a great siddha who traveled to Bodhgaya, Jalandhar, Oddiyana and China. In Oddiyana he received teachings related to the Six Branch Yoga of the Kalachakra system known as the "Approach and Attainment of the Three Adamantine States" (Wylie: rdo rje gsum gyi bsnyen sgrub) and, after returning to Tibet, founded the Orgyen Nyendrup tradition and wrote many works including a famous guide to the land of Oddiyana. Ogyenpa had many disciples including Rangjung Dorje, 3rd Karmapa Lama, Kharchupa (Wylie: mkhar chu pa, 1284—1339) and Tokden Daseng (Wylie: rtogs dan zla seng).

Barawa Gyeltsen Pelzang (1255–1343) was a great scholar of the Upper Drukpa succession of Yanggönpa. He established the Barawa sub-school, which for a time was widespread in Tibet and survived as an independent lineage until 1959. For a time this lineage was also important in Bhutan.

==== Central Drukpa ====
The Middle Drukpa (Wylie: bar 'brug) was the hereditary lineage of Tsangpa Gyare centered at Ralung. Following Tsangpa Gyare, the next holder of this lineage was his nephew Darma Sengge (Wylie: dar ma seng ge, 1177–1237), son of Tsangpa Gyare's brother Lhanyen (Wylie: lha gnyan). Darma Sengge was succeeded by his own nephew Zhönnu Sengge (Wylie: gzhon nu seng ge, 1200–66) and he by his nephew Nyima Sengge (Wylie: nyi ma seng ge, 1251–1287).

The lineage then went to his cousin Dorje Lingpa Sengge Sherap (Wylie: rdo rje gling pa seng ge shes rab, 1238–1287), son of Wöntak (Wylie: dbon stag), a member of the branch of the Drukpa lineage descended from Tsangpa Gyare's brother Lhambum Wylie: lha 'bum). The lineage passed to Sengge Sherap's brother Sengge Rinchen (Wylie: seng ge rin chen, 1258–1313), who was succeeded in turn by his son Sengge Gyelpo (Wylie: seng ge rgyal po, 1289–1326), grandson Jamyang Künga Senggé (Wylie: 'jam dbyangs kun dga' seng ge, 1289–1326), great-grandson Lodrö Sengge (Wylie: blo gros seng ge, 1345–90) and great-great-grandson Sherap Sengge (Wylie: shes rab seng ge, 1371–92). These first nine holders of Tsangpa Gyare's lineage were known as the "Incomparable Nine Lions" (Wylie: mnyam med seng ge dgu).

Sherap Sengge, who died at the age of 21, was succeeded on the throne of Ralung by his elder brother Yeshe Rinchen (Wylie: ye shes rin chen, 1364–1413) and he by his sons Namkha Pelzang (Wylie: nam mkha' dpal bzang, 1398–1425) and Sherap Zangpo (Wylie: shes rab bzang po, 1400–38). These three were considered the emanations of the three mahāsattvas Manjusri, Vajrapani and Avalokiteśvara, respectively. Sherap Zangpo's son was the second Gyalwang Drukpa, Gyelwang Jé Künga Penjor (Wylie: rgyal dbang rje kun dga' dpal 'byor, 1428–76), who received teachings from the most renowned lamas of his age and became a great author and teacher.

From the 2nd Gyalwang Drukpa, the lineage passed to his nephew Ngakwang Chögyel (Wylie: ngag dbang chos rgyal, 1465–1540), then successively in turns from father to son to Ngak gi Wangchuk Drakpa Gyeltsen (Wylie: ngag gi dbang phyug grags pa rgyal mtshan, 1517–1554), Mipham Chögyal (Wylie: mi pham chos rgyal, 1543–1604), Mipham Tenpa'i Nyima (Wylie: mi pham bstan pa'i nyi ma, 1567–1619) and Ngawang Namgyal, who was the great-great-grandson of Ngawang Chögyal.

In the Middle Drukpa tradition many great scholars appeared including the fourth Gyalwang Drukpa, Kunkhyen Pema Karpo (kun mkhyen padma dkar po) [1527—1592], Khewang Sangay Dorji (mkhas dbang sangs rgyas rdo rje) [1569—1645] and Bod Khepa Mipham Geleg Namgyal (bod mkhas pa mi pham dge legs rnam rgyal) (1618—1685) who was famed for his knowledge of poetics, grammar and medicine. His collected works fill over twenty volumes in modern editions. He founded Sangngak Chö Monastery (Wylie: gsang sngags chos gling) in 1571 to "subdue the klo pa", the inhabitants of southeastern Tibet. This monastery, which is located in modern Lhoka Prefecture of the Tibet Autonomous Region near the border with Arunachal Pradesh, India, became the seat of the successive Gyalwang Drukpa incarnations in Tibet and thus the center of the Northern Drukpa.

Three great siddhas of Middle Drukpa school were Tsangnyön Heruka (1452–1507), author of the Life of Milarepa, the Hundred Thousand Songs of Milarepa, the Life of Rechungpa, and compiler of the Demchog Khandro Nyengyud; Drukpa Kunley (1455–1529); and Ünyön Künga Zangpo (Wylie: dbus smyon kun dga' bzang po, 1458–1532). All three were disciples of the 4th Gyalwang Drukpa.

Following the death of the 4th Gyalwang Drukpa, two incarnations were recognized: Paksam Wangpo (Wylie: dpag bsam dbang po), who was the offspring of the Chongje Depa, and Ngawang Namgyal, who was also the heir to Drukpa lineage of Ralung. Paksam Wangpo gained the backing of the powerful Tsangpa Desi, who was a patron of the Karma Kagyu and hostile to Ngawang Namgyal. The latter subsequently fled to Bhutan, where his lineage already had many followers, established the Southern Drukpa, and became both the spiritual and temporal head of the country, after which the country became known as Drukyül in Standard Tibetan and Dzongkha.

== Contemporary organisation ==
The Southern Drukpa are led by the Je Khenpo (an elected office, not a tulku lineage), who is the chief abbot of the Dratshang Lhentshog of Bhutan.

The Northern Drukpa are led by the 12th Gyalwang Drukpa or incarnation of the Gyalwang Drukpa. In Kham, Khamtrul Rinpoche traditionally has been the most prominent Drukpa lineage master, and still commands a huge following in Kham.

Unlike previously where the lineage was divided geographically into Northern, Middle and Southern Drukpa, the Drukpa lineage masters today often cross these traditional borders and communicate to strengthen the lineage and the teachings. In April 2009, the first of a yearly event known as the Annual Drukpa Council (ADC) was held on Druk Amitabha Mountain in Kathmandu, Nepal. More than 40 masters of the lineage from India, Nepal, Bhutan and Tibet attended this event and over 10,000 lay practitioners and at least 1,000 monks and nuns or more met on this occasion. This was the first time an annual event for the Drukpa lineage involving all the three major branches will be held, as a concerted effort to reunite the strengths of the Drukpa lineage and to mend the historical connections of different monasteries and organizations.

In July 2007, when the lineage celebrated its 800-plus-years' legacy in Shey, Ladakh, more than 100,000 attended the event that included celebrations and prayers, as well as mask dancing by 300 nuns. This event, boasted of the first firework in the Himalayas, the first 800 sky lanterns being lit in the Himalayas and the first 12,000 biodegradable balloons sent to the sky, was covered by international media

In 2010, the Gyalwang Drukpa launched an initiative to plant one million trees in Ladakh, as part of the 'one million trees' campaign initiated by Wangari Maathaï, recipient of the Nobel Peace Prize in 2004. As part of this initiative, the Gyalwang Drukpa led the Live to Love volunteers to break the Guinness World Record twice for most trees planted simultaneously. The first in October 2010, 9,313 volunteers planted 50,033 trees within half an hour, breaking their first Guinness World Records for the "Most Trees Planted" category. In October 2012, they broke again the Guinness World Records for the same category, with over 9,800 volunteers planted nearly 100,000 trees, safeguarding villages from mudslides and cleaning polluted air.

The Drukpa lineage under the guidance of its spiritual masters, in particular the Twelfth Gyalwang Drukpa, has established centers across the world, especially in Europe.

In 2016, National Geographic Books published the book StarTalk: Everything You Ever Need to Know About Space Travel, Sci-Fi, the Human Race, the Universe, and Beyond, in which a fragment of an interview Neil deGrasse Tyson, Eugene Mirman, and Jason Sudekis had with the 12th Gyalwang Drukpa was released where the Drukpa discussed his views on trees and religion. He believes that trees, plants, and nature communicate with Buddhists, Christians, and those of every religion and lack thereof.

== Commemorative stamp ==
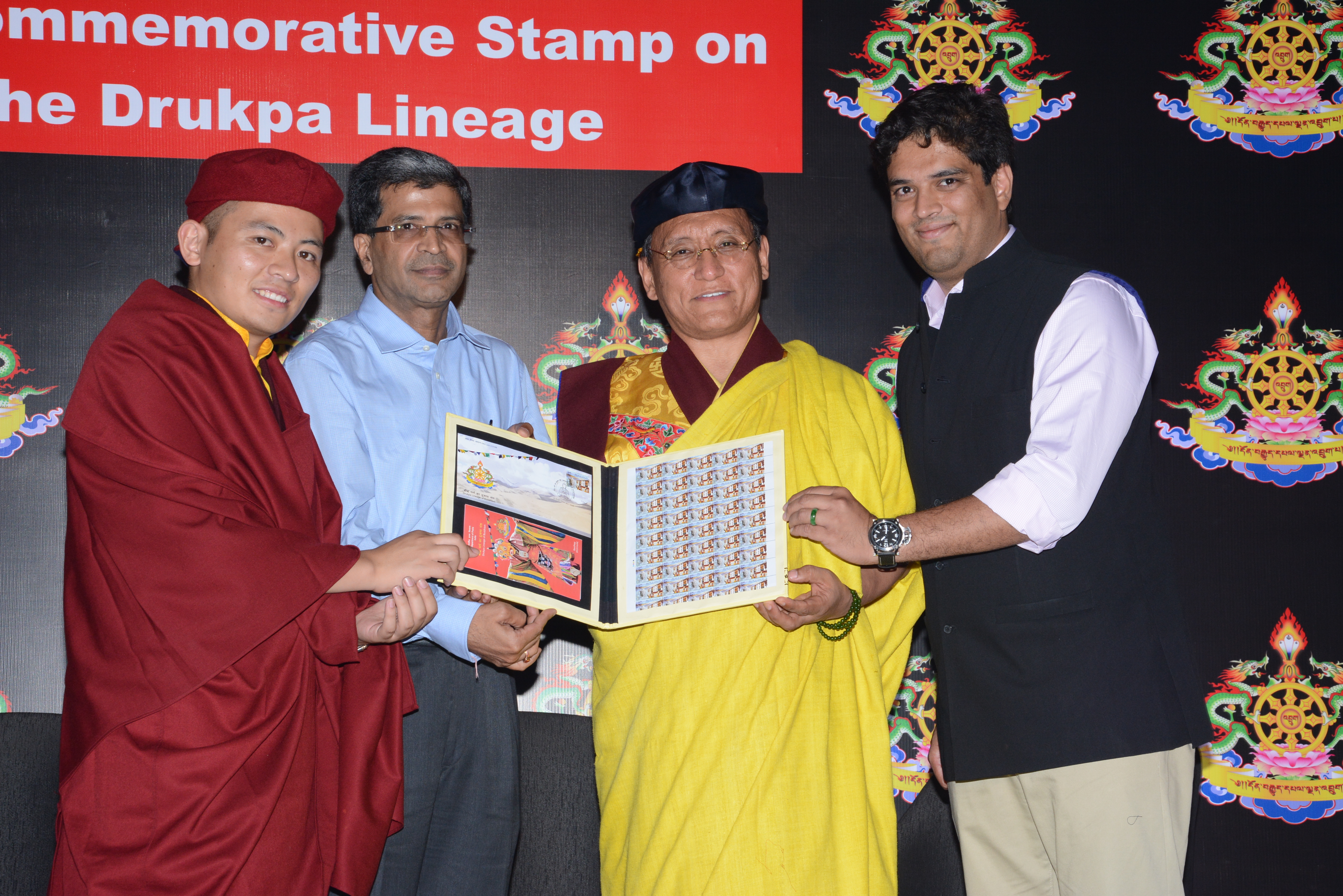
Drukpa Thuksey Rinpoche, Shri SK Sinha, Member (HRD), Department of Posts, the Gyalwang Drukpa and Arjun Pandey holding the newly released stamp and first-day cover on "The Drukpa Lineage of Buddhism"

On 14 May 2014, the Department of Posts celebrated Buddha Purnima with the release of a commemorative stamp on the Drukpa Buddhists, a rare and perhaps the first recognition given by the Indian government to a particular Buddhist lineage.

== Forced conversion by China ==
On 10 September 2014, the Gyalwang Drukpa issued an official statement accusing Beijing of fanning intra-sect rivalries by using the Chinese-led subset-under-occupation of the Karma Kagyu to forcibly take over Drukpa monasteries in the holy Mount Kailash area of Tibet, with Drukpa monks and yogis being forced out of their monasteries, and photographs of Drukpa masters replaced with photographs of the (Chinese-recognized) Karmapa, Ogyen Trinley Dorje. The Gyalwang Drukpa stated, "They are using (the Karmapa's) name, but I don't think he is responsible."

The office of Karmapa Ogyen Trinley Dorje quickly replied, saying, "His Holiness does not believe in (forced) conversion. He has a broad outlook, and there is no conversion plan. He believes in harmony and dialogue between all sects, and we all belong to the broad Buddhist tradition." Spokesperson Kunzang Chunvyalp added that the Karmapa has urged that Drukpa monasteries which have been desecrated "be restored because they are very sacred."

== Kung-Fu Nuns ==
In 2018 BBC reported on the Kung Fu Nuns from the Drukpa Kagyu school who are mostly black belts in kung fu. After a visit to Vietnam where the Gyalwang Drukpa saw nuns receiving martial arts training, he decided to bring the idea back to Nepal by encouraging nuns to learn self-defence. His motive was simple: promote gender equality and empower young women who mostly came from poor backgrounds in India and Tibet. Kung-Fu Nuns also learn skills that are available only to monks in other lineages, such as plumbing, driving, and electrical fitting.

== Monasticism ==
Important monasteries of the Drukpa order include:

- Druk Sangag Choeling Monastery
- Hemis Monastery
- Kardang Monastery, the main monastery in Lahaul
- Punakha Dzong, the winter home of the Dratshang Lhentshog
- Ralung Monastery in Central Tibet just north of Bhutan
- Tashichho Dzong, Thimphu, which houses the Dratshang Lhentshog in summer

Notable nunneries include:

- Dongyu Gatsal Ling Nunnery in Himachal Pradesh, India

== List of successive Gyalwang Drukpas ==
| Name | Lived |
|---|---|
| Drogon Tsangpa Gyare | 1161 - 1211 |
| Kunga Paljor | 1428 - 1476 |
| Jamyang Chodrak | 1478 - 1523 |
| Kunkhyen Pema Karpo | 1527 - 1592 |
| Pagsam Wangpo | 1593 - 1641 |
| Mipham Wangpo | 1641 - 1717 |
| Kagyü Trinle Shingta | 1718 - 1766 |
| Künzik Chönang | 1768 - 1822 |
| Jigme Mingyur Wangyel | 1823 - 1883 |
| Mipham Chökyi Wangpo | 1884 - 1930 |
| Tendzin Khyenrab Geleg Wangpo | 1931 - 1960 |
| Jigme Pema Wangchen | 1963–present |
