= Yoshiro Imaeda =

Japanese-born Tibetologist (born 1947)

Yoshiro Imaeda (Japanese: 今枝 由郎, Hepburn: Imaeda Yoshirō; born 1947) is a Japanese-born Tibetologist who has spent his career in France. He is director of research emeritus at the National Center for Scientific Research in France.

Born in Aichi Prefecture, Imaeda graduated from the Otani University Faculty of Letters, where he studied with Shoju Inaba, under whose advice he pursued graduate studies in France, where he earned his Ph.D. at Paris VII. He began work at the CNRS in 1974. Between 1981 and 1990, he worked as an adviser to the National Library of Bhutan. In 1995, he was a visiting professor at the University of California, Berkeley, and has also held a visiting appointment at Columbia University.

Imaeda's research has focused on the Tibetan documents of the Dunhuang manuscripts, but he has also translated the poems of the 6th Dalai Lama, and produced a catalog of Kanjur texts.

== Selected works ==
- Kuløy, Hallvard Kȧre and Yoshiro Imaeda (1986). Bibliography of Tibetan studies. Narita: Naritasan Shinshōji.
- Imaeda, Yoshiro (1988). Papermaking in Bhutan. Kasama: Cannabis Press.
- Imaeda, Yoshiro (2000). Rituel des traités de paix sino-tibétains du VIIIe au IXe siècle, La Sérinde, terre d'échanges (2000) 87-98.
- Imaeda, Yoshiro (2008). Enchanted by Bhutan. Thimphu : KMT Publishers, 2008.
- Imaeda, Yoshiro (2010). "The Bar do thos grol, or 'The Tibetan Book of the Dead': Tibetan Conversion to Buddhism or Tibetanization of Buddhism?" in Esoteric Buddhism at Dunhuang ed. Matthew T. Kapstein and Sam van Schaik. Leiden: Brill. 145-158.
- Imaeda, Yoshiro, Matthew Kapstein, and Tsuguhito Takeuchi, eds. (2011). New studies of the old Tibetan documents : philology, history and religion. Tokyo: Research Institute for Languages and Cultures of Asia and Africa, Tokyo University of Foreign Studies.
