= Tsangpa Gyare =

Tibetan ascetic (1161–1211)

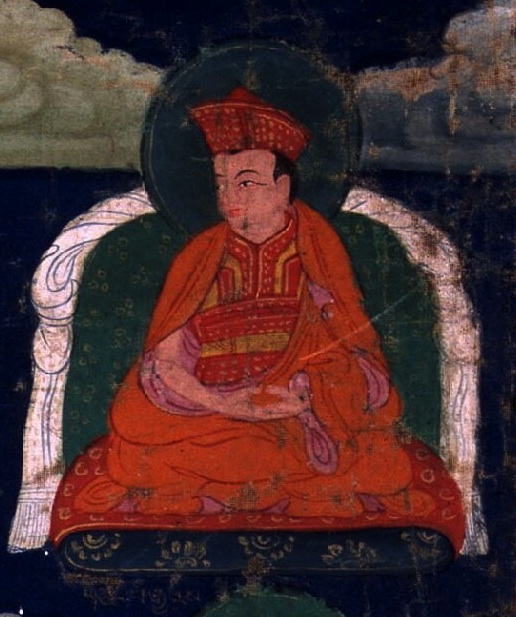
Tsangpa Gyare (1161–1211)

Drogon Tsangpa Gyare (1161–1211) was a Buddhist ascetic and the main disciple of Lingchen Repa Pema Dorje and the founder of the Drukpa Lineage of Tibetan Buddhism the main or central branch of which was, until the 17th century, transmitted by his hereditary family lineage at Ralung in the Tsang region of Tibet. Later, following the birth of Gyalwang Je Kunga Paljor (1428–1476) considered to be the first of his re-incarnations, Tsangpa Gyare was held to be the first of a succession of Gyalwang Drukpa or Drukchen incarnations who, at the time of the fifth Gyalwang Drukpa Pagsam Wangpo (1593–1653), became established as the reincarnate leaders of the Drukpa lineage in Tibet.

== Biographical details ==
Drogon Tsangpa Gyare was born into the Gya clan at a place near Kule in the Tsang province of Southern Tibet. His father was Gya Zurpo Tsabpey and his mother Marza Darkyi. According to legend and hagiography, the child was born with his birth membrane intact, causing his parents to abandon him through fear. Whilst a giant eagle protected the vulnerable child with his wings, the new born kicked through the membrane leaving a footmark on the nearby rock.

As a young man, Drogon Tsangpa Gyare was a practitioner who studied the Sutra canon of the time, including Logic, The Way of the Bodhisattva, Metaphysics, the Transcendent Perfection of Great Wisdom and the Middle Path.

He met his Guru Lingchen Repa when he was 23.

After establishing Longbol (kLong rBol) and Ralung monasteries Drogon Tsangpa Gyare went to a place called Nam Phu to build a monastery. It is said that when he and his disciples reached the place nine roaring dragons arose from the ground and soared in the sky. The Tibetan word for dragon is 'Brug which is pronounced as 'Druk'. The flying dragons were taken to be an auspicious omen and the monastery and the lineage which sprang from it came to be known as the Drukpa. This school eventually became very popular in Tibet and surrounding regions. Many followers of this school were simple people, content with few material possessions, known for their deep practice of the dharma.

It is claimed that he pacified a demon on a pilgrimage route to Tsari Mountain.

== Students ==
- Önre Darma Senge (dar ma sengge) [1177—1237] - nephew of Tsangpa Gyare and first of the Middle Drukpa Kagyu lineage based at Ralung.
- Zhonnu Senge (gzhon nu sengge) [1200—1266] - nephew of Tsangpa Gyare and successor of Önre Darma Senge.
- Gotsangpa Gonpo Dorje (rgod tshang pa mgon po rdo rje) [1189—1258]
- Lorepa Wangchug Tsondru (lo ras pa dbang phyug brtson 'grus) [1187—1250]
- Gyaltsha Rinchen Gon (rgyal tsha rin chen mgon) [1118—1195] - Trophu Kagyu
- Dremowa ('bras mo ba) - founder of myang stod 'bras mo dgon
- Terkungpa
