= Druk White Lotus School =

Druk Padma Karpo School

Location
- India; 34°04′28″N 77°38′40″E

Information
- Type: Public
- Campus type: Rural
- Website: www.dwls.org

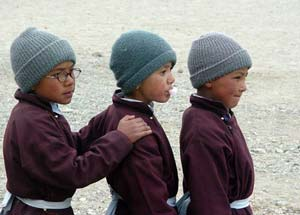
Three children after morning roll call.

The Druk White Lotus School is located in Shey, Ladakh, in northern India, and is known locally as the Druk Padma Karpo School. Karpo means White and Padma means Lotus in the local language Bodhi.

== About ==
The school was started at the request of the people of Ladakh who wanted a school that would help maintain their rich cultural traditions, based on Tibetan Buddhism, while equipping their children for a life in the 21st century.

The masterplan and school buildings, designed by architects and engineers from Arup Associates and Ove Arup & Partners, combine local building techniques and materials with leading edge environmental design to make them effective in the extreme climate. In 2012, landscape architects from the School of Architecture, Design and Construction at the University of Greenwich began work on a landscape master plan and garden for the DWLS School.

The school offers a broad education, initially in the Ladakhi language and English. Residential blocks allow children from Ladakh's remote areas to attend, and a programme of sponsorship ensures that the poorest are not excluded. It is managed by the Druk Pema Karpo Educational Society and financed with money raised internationally.

Druk White Lotus/Padma Karpo school is being built in stages. The Nursery and Infant Courtyard opened in September 2001, and the Junior School in November 2004. Middle and Secondary School facilities were built year by year as funds permitted, with the last two secondary school classrooms completed in 2014. Additional facilities for residential students and the school are ongoing.

The school was featured in a 2007 episode of the PBS series Design e2, Cisco Systems "Human Network" advertisement as well as the Aamir Khan movie 3 Idiots. The school was damaged in August 2010 when cloudbursts caused flash floods that washed mud and boulders into many school buildings. The Bollywood star Aamir Khan made a special effort to lend a helping hand.

== Founder, patrons and supporters ==
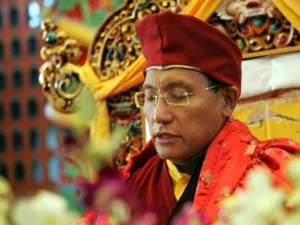
The Gyalwang Drukpa, the spiritual leader of Ladakh

Founder

- The Gyalwang Drukpa

Patrons

- The 14th Dalai Lama
- The 2nd Thuksey Rinpoche

Honorary patrons

- Joanna Lumley OBE FRGS
- Richard Gere
- Dowager Countess Cawdor
- Viscount Cowdray and Viscountess Cowdray

Supporters

- The Yardbirds
- Donovan
- Peaks Foundation

== Awards ==
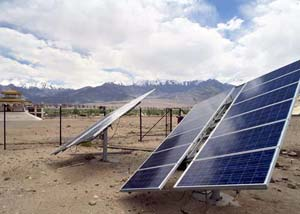
Solar panels for generating electricity, part of the school's award-winning, eco-friendly, architecture.

- The International Architecture in Stone Award, 2013:
- The Emirates Glass LEAF Awards, 2012 for 'Best Sustainable Development':
- ‘Test of Time: Environmental’ Award from the British Council for School Environments, 2012:
- Design for Asia Grand Award, 2009:
- Award for ‘Inspiring Design – International’ from the British Council for School Environments, 2009:
- Australian National Association of Women in Construction, 2005:
  - Sinclair Knight Merz Award for Achievement in Development
- British Consultants and Construction Bureau – International Expertise Awards, 2003:
  - Large Consultancy Firm of the Year 2003 (Arup Associates)
- World Architecture Awards, 2002, (Arup Associates):
  - Best Asian Building
  - Best Education Building
  - Best Green Building (joint winner)

== See also ==
- Tibetan Children's Villages
