= Ngawang Namgyal (Rinpungpa) =

4th Rinpunga Tibetan ruler (?–1544)

Ngawang Namgyal (Tibetan: ངགཌབང་རྣམ-རྒྱལ, Wylie: ngag-dbang rnam-rgyal; died 1544 or somewhat later) was a prince of the Rinpungpa dynasty that dominated the Tsang region in West Central Tibet between 1435 and 1565. He reigned from 1512 to 1544, and was a patron of the Karma Kagyu school as was the Rinpungpa dynasty.

== The succession ==
Ngawang Namgyal was the son of Tsokye Dorje and the grandson of the founder of the dynasty's fortune, Norzang. According to the Rinpung durab he was born in a Year of the Tiger (1470, 1482, 1494). He is first mentioned in 1510, when his father died. At this time the Rinpungpa had a dominating role in the politics of Central Tibet and also held suzerainty over Guge in western Tibet. The leader of the family was Ngawang Namgyal's cousin Donyo Dorje. The Phagmodrupa dynasty, the actual monarchs (gongmas) of Tibet, had been reduced to relative insignificance. However, since 1509 a conflict had arisen between the Rinpungpa and the young and able Phagmodrupa gongma Ngawang Tashi Drakpa. When the funeral for Tsokye Dorje were still going on in 1510, Donyo Dorje ordered Ngawang Namgyal to lead a military incursion to Gyeladring, which was opposed by the Phagmodrupa. A reconciliation between the two princely families followed, but in 1512 the powerful Donyo Dorje died without leaving an adult son to succeed him. In his will he pointed out Zilnonpa of Nakhartse (b. 1505), the son of a mistress, as his successor. Zilnonpa is occasionally mentioned in the sources up to 1567. However, in the decades after 1512 it is Ngawang Namgyal who is the military leader of the Rinpungpa, sometimes referred as dsongpon (vassal lord) and foremost minister under the gongma.

== Decline of military power ==
Ngawang Namgyal and Zilnonpa were far less successful than their predecessor Donyo Dorje. In 1515 the simmering hostility between the Rinpungpa and Phagmodrupa erupted, and the former were worsted in a series of clashes. The fief Gyalkhartse, which had hitherto sided with the Rinpungpa, switched sides and took some territories from the latter. The forces of Ngawang Namgyal were expelled from the Lhasa area in 1517, meaning that the Gelugpa sect of Buddhism could celebrate the Monlam (prayer) festival for the first time in 20 years. A settlement was made in 1518. The gongma conferred formal investiture on Zilnonpa as dsongpon (vassal lord) of Rinpung, the original home of the family. In that way the Phagmodrupa regained some of their former authority in Ü (East Central Tibet), while the Rinpungpa remained dominant in Tsang. Fresh troubles between Ü and Tsang broke out in 1538, although the rough balance of power remained. Ngawang Namgyal to an extent made good his losses through acquisitions in other directions. Thus, Gyantse, Panam and Sengetse in Tsang, and furthermore the western principalities Latö Lho and Latö Chang, came under his authority in 1547 (?) and later.

== The invasion of Mirza Muhammad Haidar Dughlat ==
The military adventurer Mirza Muhammad Haidar Dughlat, who was in the service of the ruler of Kashgar, invaded Ladakh and Kashmir in 1532-33 and subjugated the local Ladakhi rulers. The enterprise appears to have been part of a strategy of Kashgar to secure the route from Yarkand to the fertile Kashmir Valley and hence to South Asia. In the fall of 1532 Haidar set out on a new eastbound expedition with the aim to reach "Ursang" (Ü-Tsang, meaning Lhasa), which was described by him as the Mecca of the Tibetans. The Muslim invasion met with very little resistance and reached the Manasarover Lake. There, however, most of the horses of the army died. Haidar and part of the troops proceeded and plundered the livestock of the province of Ham or Hari (Ngari?). But the terrain and climate of Tibet proved more difficult to overcome than any army. When he had arrived to Askabrak, only eight days' march from Lhasa (thus somewhere in Tsang), Haidar eventually realized that the enterprise was forlorn. In early 1533 he returned to Ladakh after losing a substantial part of the army. The invasion is unmentioned in the Tibetan histories although it must have affected the areas under the Rinpungpa severely. Haidar undertook new operations in Ladakh and Baltistan in 1545 and 1548, but any Kashgari influence in western Tibet ended with his death in 1551.

== Cultural efforts ==
In spite of his varying political fortunes, Ngawang Namgyal was reputed to be a prominent and haughty warrior, and scholar. He engaged in the so-called five lesser sciences and sixty-four arts (literary skills, astronomy, performing arts, etc.). He re-introduced the custom of wearing clothing and ornaments after the style of the Tibetan Empire's kings (the Rinchen Gyencha custom) during larger ceremonies at Rinpung. The renowned large silk painting of Ngak Drupma was made during his time. His son Ngawang Jigme Drakpa lauded his father in the highest term as a highly respected and handsome person who attracted the yoginis and exchanged smiles and glimpses. He credited him as an ornament of the Three Worlds and a Dharma King (Chokyi Gyalpo). According to the Zhigling namthar of Sogdogpa, Ngawang Namgyal died in 1544. The Karmapa arranged for funds for his funerary rites. Other information suggests that Ngawang Namgyal was engaged in warfare in 1547 and still alive in 1551. In 1554, when the Karmapa hierarch Mikyö Dorje stayed in Tsari, he was requested to say dedicatory prayers for the deceased Rinpungpa lord Rinchen Wanggyal, otherwise unknown. It has been suggested that this alludes to Ngawang Namgyal. However, the Rigpa dzinpai phonya indicates that Rinchen Wanggyal was in fact a son of Ngawang Namgyal. The late ruler is otherwise credited with three sons, the eldest of whom died early. The other two, Dondup Tseten Dorje and Ngawang Jigme Drakpa succeeded their father, although the details are obscure. After these sons, the leadership of the Rinpungpa lineage came to an end.

Preceded by Donyo Dorje	Ruler of Tsang; 1512–1544	Succeeded by Dondup Tseten Dorje
