= Kunzang =

2nd Rinpunga Tibetan leader (1445-1479)

Kunzang (1445 – 1479), in full Kuntu Zangpo (Tibetan: ཀུན་ཏུ་བཟང་པོ, Wylie: Kun tu bzang po), was a prince of the Rinpungpa Dynasty that wielded power in Tsang (West Central Tibet).

He was the second son of Norzang, the founder of the power of the family, and the Phagmodrupa princess Yeshe Tsogyal. At the time when his father died in 1466, Tsang was dominated by the arms of the Rinpungpa. Kunzang took over as the senior member of the line, his elder brother Upasika having died early. He received investiture as dsongpon (lord) of the Rinpung fief from the formal ruler of Central Tibet, Kunga Lekpa of the Phagmodrupa dynasty. His younger brothers lorded over Shigatse, Kharthog and Nyangkhok. However, his accession marked a temporary downturn in the successes of the Rinpungpa armies. The Phagmodrupa monarch, who had his residence in Nêdong in Ü (East Central Tibet), generally held an averse attitude to the Rinpungpa. Like his father, Kunzang was a patron of the Sakya sect of Buddhism and established a patron-preceptor relation with the hierarch Kunkhyen Sangye Pal. He upheld a similar relation with Gorampa Sonam Senge, also of the Sakya sect. He is also connected with the construction of the monastery Thubten Namgyal in 1473. Kunzang had two sons called Dorje Tseten (b. 1462) and Donyo Dorje (1463–1512), of whom the latter took over the leadership of the family at Kunzang's demise, some time prior to 1479.

| Preceded by Norzang | Ruler of Tsang; 1466–c. 1479 | Succeeded by Donyo Dorje |
