= Ngawang =

Ngawang is a given name. Notable people with the name include:

- Ngawang Tashi Bapu (born 1968), former Principal Chant Master of Drepung Loseling Monastery
- Ngawang Choephel (born 1966), documentary filmmaker, director, producer, and musician
- Ngawang Jigme Drakpa (died 1597), the last ruling prince of Tsang (West Central Tibet) of the Rinpungpa dynasty
- Ngawang Tashi Drakpa (1488–1564), king of Tibet who ruled in 1499–1554 and 1556/57–1564
- Ngawang Drakpa Gyaltsen (died 1603), king in Central Tibet who ruled in 1554–1556/57, and 1576–1603/04
- Etsun Jamphel Ngawang Lobsang Yeshe Tenzin Gyatso (born 1935), 14th Dalai Lama, highest spiritual leader and head of Tibet
- Ngawang Lobsang Gyatso (1617–1682), 5th Dalai Lama, with effective temporal and spiritual power over all Tibet
- Ngawang Tsoknyi Gyatso (born 1966), Tibetan Buddhist teacher and author, founder of the Pundarika Foundation
- Ngawang Yeshey Gyatso (1686–1725), pretender for the position of the 6th Dalai Lama of Tibet
- Ngawang Jamphel (born 1992), Bhutanese footballer
- Ngapoi Ngawang Jigme (1910–2009), Tibetan senior official with various military and political responsibilities
- Sakya Trizin Ngawang Kunga (born 1945), the 41st Sakya Trizin, the throne holder of the Sakya Lineage of Tibetan Buddhism 1952–2017
- Trulshik Rinpoche Ngawang Chökyi Lodrö (1923–2011), teacher of the 14th Dalai Lama and of many Nyingma lamas
- Ngawang Namgyal (1594–1651), Tibetan Buddhist lama and the unifier of Bhutan as a nation-state
- Ngawang Namgyal (Rinpungpa) (died 1544), prince of the Rinpungpa dynasty in West Central Tibet
- Ngawang Pem, Bhutanese civil servant, the first woman Dzongda in Bhutan
- Ngawang Rinchen (born 1984), Chinese actor of Tibetan descent
- Ngawang Jigdral Rinpoche, Nyingma tulku of Sherpa decent
- Ngawang Samten (born 1956), Tibetan educationist, Tibetologist, vice chancellor of the Central University for Tibetan Studies
- Ngawang Sangdrol (born 1977), former political prisoner, imprisoned at the age of 13 by the Government of the People's Republic of China for peacefully demonstrating against the Chinese occupation of Tibet in 1992
- Ngawang Sungrab Thutob (1874–1952), known as Geshe Wangyal and "America's first lama," Buddhist lama and scholar of Kalmyk origin

== See also ==
- Dolma Phodrang Ngawang Kunga Thegchen Palbar Thinley Samphel Wanggi Gyalpo, the traditional title of the head of the Sakya school of Tibetan Buddhism
- Khenpo Ngawang Pelzang, considered by the Tibetan tradition to be an emanation of Vimalamitra
- Ngaiawang
- Ngelawang
