= Tsokye Dorje =

9th Phagmodrupa Tibetan ruler (1450–1510)

Tsokye Dorje (Tibetan: གཙོ་སྐྱེས་རྡོ་རྗེ, Wylie: mTs'o skyes rdo rje, 1450–1510) was a regent of Tibet who ruled in 1491–1499. He belonged to the Rinpungpa family and headed the central government in Nêdong during the minority of the heir of the Phagmodrupa dynasty.

== Rinpungpa ascendency ==
Tsokye Dorje was the fourth son of Norzang, who founded the fortunes of the Rinpungpa in 1435. From this time the family dominated political life in the Tsang region (West Central Tibet) at the expense of the Phagmodrupa kings who resided in Nêdong in Ü (East Central Tibet). When Norzang died in 1466, his second son Kunzang took over the leadership of the family, while Tsokye Dorje received the fief Khartog in the Yarlung Valley area. The direct influence of the Phagmodrupa was on the wane, and in 1481 one of their line was deposed by his ministers after a Rinpungpa attack. The next ruler Ngagi Wangpo had a short and turbulent reign, and when he died in 1491 his son Ngawang Tashi Drakpa was only a boy of three. It was then decided to appoint Tsokye Dorje of the Rinpungpa as regent during his minority. At this time the chief of the Rinpungpa faction was Tsokye Dorje's nephew Donyo Dorje (1463–1512).

== Internal feuding ==
In spite of the position of Rinpungpa kinsmen in both Tsang and Ü, the political turmoil in Central Tibet continued. In 1492 Donyo Dorje invaded Ü and captured three districts. In 1498 he captured Lhasa where his forces maintained Rinpungpa power until 1517. The Rinpungpa were intimately allied to the Karmapa sect. The Gelugpa monks of Drepung and Sera were therefore impeded from celebrating the annual Monlam festival during the occupation of Lhasa. Finally, in 1499, several officers under Donyo Dorje convened in Nêdong and decided to enthrone the Phagmodrupa heir Ngawang Tashi Drakpa. Tsokye Dorje appears to have handed over power without making trouble, and eventually died in 1510. He may have had an appeasing influence on political affairs, since his demise immediately triggered a violent conflict between Donyo Dorje and Ngawang Tashi Drakpa. A son of Tsokye Dorje, Ngawang Namgyal, later became the leader of the Rinpungpa faction.

== See also ==
- History of Tibet
- Sino-Tibetan relations during the Ming dynasty

Preceded by Ngagi Wangpo	Ruler of Tibet; 1491–1499	Succeeded by Ngawang Tashi Drakpa
