= Donyo Dorje =

3rd Rinpunga Tibetan leader (1463–1512)

Donyo Dorje (Tibetan: དོན་ཡོད་རྡོ་རྗེ, Wylie: Don yod rdo rje) (1463 – 23 March 1512) was the third and most powerful prince of the Rinpungpa Dynasty that held power in much of Central Tibet from 1479 to 1512.

== Succession and religious patronate ==
Donyo Dorje was the second son of the previous Rinpungpa prince Kunzang who was the dominant prince in Tsang (West Central Tibet). Although they reigned autonomously, the Rinpungpa still formally honoured the Phagmodrupa dynasty in Ü (East Central Tibet). Kunzang appears to have died by 1479, in which year Donyo Dorje established a preceptor-patron relationship with the Buddhist hierarch Chokyi Drakpa of the Shamarpa sect, and also kept a good relation with the hierarch of the Karmapa, Chödrak Gyatso. He furthermore had a monastery built in Yangpachen. Chödrak Gyatso asked Donyo Dorje to found a monastery at the outskirts of Lhasa, in an area that was heavily influenced by the Gelugpa sect. Gelugpa monks from Sera and Drepung took offence and ruined the construction. This incident increased the tense religious and political situation in Central Tibet. The gongma or ruler Kunga Lekpa, of the old Phagmodrupa dynasty, resided in Nêdong south-east of Lhasa. He was influenced by the powerful minister Konchok Rinchen of the Kazhipa family and had a bad relationship with the Rinpungpa.

== The takeover of Ü ==
In 1480 Donyo Dorje led a sizeable army into Ü, cooperating with troops from Yung, Yargyab and Gongkar. He reached the heart of the Yarlung valley and marched into Kyishö close to Lhasa. The Kazhipa family was ousted and some districts were appropriated by the Rinpungpa. A plundering raid against the Ganden monastery was however repulsed, supposedly through rites that evoked the power of the six-armed protector deity Mahakala. A grand meeting was then held among the leading figures of Central Tibet, in 1481, and in the end the current king Kunga Lekpa was deposed and replaced by his nephew Ngagi Wangpo. Still the local conflicts wore on, and in 1485 Donyo Dorje attacked Gyangtse. When Ngagi Wangpo died in 1491 his son Ngawang Tashi Drakpa was only a minor. In the absence of a Phagmodrupa king, Donyo Dorje's uncle Tsokye Dorje was made caretaker ruler in Nêdong.

== Height of Rinpungpa powers ==
During the following years the power of the Rinpungpa in Central Tibet was very considerable. Donyo Dorje was addressed with the royal titles chogyal and miwang, and known as Ü-Tsang Ruzhi Sakyong (Ruler of all of Central Tibet). Due to his frequent campaigning and staying in tent residences he was furthermore referred as Depa Garpa (the mobile or camping ruler). Besides being a protector of the Shamarpa and Karmapa hierarchs, he also initiated cordial relations with the abbots of Drikung and Taklung. The assassination of a local Lhasa patron of the Shamarpa and Shanagpa sects in 1498 triggered a new intervention by Donyo Dorje. The Tsang forces occupied the estate Neu, whose lord had perpetrated the deed. Tighter control was imposed over Lhasa, the Potala and other places. From this date until 1517 the Karmapa monks, supported by Rinpungpa troops, impeded the Gelugpa monks from participating in the annual Monlam festival in Lhasa. The expansion also went in other directions; in 1499 Donyo Dorje subordinated the Guge kingdom in western Tibet through peaceful means.

== Rising tension ==
In 1499 Tsokye Dorje stepped down as regent of Nêdong, and the young Ngawang Tashi Drakpa was enthroned as Phagmodru monarch with the consent of Donyo Dorje. Five years later a marriage was arranged between the new ruler and a Rinpungpa princess. In spite of these arrangements, trouble briefly arose between Phagmodrupa and Rinpungpa in 1509. In the next year the old Tsokye Dorje died, and as his funeral ceremonies were in process an armed conflict flared up between Donyo Dorje and Ngawang Tashi Drakpa. A reconciliation was achieved in the same year through the intervention of a cleric, and Donyo Dorje made homage before the young king. Shortly after these events he died, on 23 March 1512. A grand funeral ceremony was performed for him. As established in his will the dignity of leadership was taken over by the young Zilnonpa from Nakhartse (b. 1505). This boy was born to the celebrated beauty Tsewang Tsangmo, wife of the lord of Nakhartse, who had been forced to give herself to Donyo Dorje. Apart from Zilnonpa he had three children with other women, namely Dorje Butri, Serkhangma, and Legtso Gyalmo. The latter married the Phagmodrupa king Ngawang Tashi Drakpa. After this date the powers of the Rinpungpa slowly began to decline. The next ruling member of the family was his cousin Ngawang Namgyal.

Preceded by Kunzang	Ruler of Tsang c. 1479–1512	Succeeded by Ngawang Namgyal
