= Drowai Gonpo =

Drowai Gonpo (aGro bai mgon po, c. 1508–1548) was a king who wielded power in parts of Central Tibet from 1524 to 1548. He belonged to the Phagmodrupa dynasty which reigned over Tibet or parts of it from 1354 to the early 17th century.

Drowai Gonpo was a son of the ruler Ngawang Tashi Drakpa (d. 1564), the last important leader of the dynasty and known by the Fifth Dalai Lama as the "King of Tibet". His mother was a lady of the Rinpungpa family, which was dominant in the Tsang region of West Central Tibet. In 1524 Drowai Gonpo was established as sub-ruler in Gongri Karpo to the west of the Nêdong palace where his father dwelt. Like his father he received the royal title gongma, "the high one". He married a lady from Chontse who gave birth to Ngawang Drakpa Gyaltsen. In another marriage, with a daughter of the Ganden lord, he sired Sonam Drakpa Gyaltsen (d. 1566?) and Namgyal Rabten (d. 1568?). The move of a part of the Phagmodrupa family to Gongri Karpo caused serious internal feuds in the dynasty, some years after the death of Drowai Gonpo (1548). This led to the complete eclipse of Phagmodrupa power in Central Tibet. After the demise of Drowai Gonpo, a stupa decorated with jewels was erected at Gongri Karpo to contain his remains.

== See also ==
- Tibet during the Ming Dynasty
- History of Tibet
