= Gongma Drakpa Gyaltsen =

5th Phagmodrupa Tibetan ruler (1374-1432)

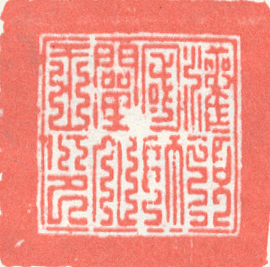
Seal of Gongma Drakpa Gyaltsen as Guanding Guoshi

Gongma Drakpa Gyaltsen (Tibetan: གྲགས་ཕ་རྒྱལ་མཚན, Wylie: Gong ma grags pa rgyal mts'an, 1374–1432) was a king of Tibet who ruled in 1385–1432. He belonged to the Phagmodrupa dynasty, which was the leading regime in Tibet between 1354 and 1435. His reign was comparatively tranquil, but he was also the last ruler of the dynasty to wield full powers over the central parts of Tibet.

== Accession to the throne ==
Drakpa Gyaltsen was the eldest son of Shakya Rinchen, a brother of a former ruler of the dynasty, Jamyang Shakya Gyaltsen. His mother was called Zina Rinchen Som. His father had very briefly succeeded to the rulership of Central Tibet in 1373, but lost his mind when a house where he stayed overnight caught fire. The young Drakpa Gyaltsen was considered an incarnation of Jamyang (Manjushri, the Bodhisattva of wisdom). Like the other Phagmodrupa rulers he had a monastic upbringing, and was ordained as lama of the Tsethang monastery in 1380. Five years later he was raised to the dignity of regent of Tibet by a faction opposed to the current ruler Sonam Drakpa. His maternal uncles tried to wield power from behind the throne, but were not able to maintain themselves in the face of the court ministers.

== Successful reign ==
After some time Drakpa Gyaltsen began to rule on his own. According to the Tibetan chronicles he had good physical and intellectual capabilities. Tibet made much progress in wealth and prosperity. "Power, fortune, and wisdom were ever attached to him." Apart from two brief conflicts in the Tsang region, his reign was peaceful; "Ü and Tsang [Central Tibet] became like one soft piece of silk". The ruling prince of Gyantse in Tsang, which had long guarded its autonomy, was forced to do homage to the Phagmodrupa ruler, and the prince Rabten Kunzang Phag was formally appointed treasurer. Unlike the previous rulers, who had been content with the title desi (regent), Drakpa Gyaltsen was addressed with the royal titles gongma (the high one, superior) and chogyal (saintly king). He nevertheless remained a lama.

== Relations with China ==
The Hongwu Emperor of China heard of his accession in 1388 and conferred the title Guanding Guoshi upon him. Later, in 1406, the Ming Emperor sent a jade seal with a dragon-headed button to Drakpa Gyaltsen, together with 500 ounces of silver, three dresses of silk, flowered stuffs, fifty bolts of silk, and 200 pounds of Bashan tea. Envoys continued to be dispatched back and forth during Drakpa Gyaltsen's long reign. The king received the title wang (prince) from the Mings, as did the religious lords of Drigung, Tsedong and Ling. They were known as "the four wang of Tibet". The honorary title Chanhuawang (Prince who Expounds Buddhism) was borne by Drakpa Gyaltsen and his successors on the throne until the 17th century.

Nevertheless, the Yongle Emperor tried to obtain real ruling power over Tibet by using the Fifth Karmapa, Dezhin Shegpa (1384–1415) as a tool. The Karmapa was invited to the imperial court in 1406. He received three petitions from Drakpa Gyaltsen with a lament that "without an overlord there would be no protection [and] through which he offered head and body [to the emperor]". The Karmapa accordingly arrived to Nanjing in 1407, was received with great pomp, and accepted to be the spiritual head of Dokham (East Tibet), Central Tibet, and Rapgang. As a Tibetan pro-Karmapa report had it: "In brief, his kindness of having protected Tibet from the terror of Chinese warfare cannot be measured. Nevertheless, there seemed to be no one in Tibet who understood this as kindness". The attempt to install the Karmapa as the emperor's vassal thus failed, and the Ming emperors were henceforth content with cultivating peaceful relations with various formally dependent Tibetan hierarchs.

== Religious patronage ==
Gongma Drakpa Gyaltsen was a patron of Tsongkhapa, the well-known renovator of Tibetan Buddhism. With his endorsement, Tsongkhapa and his closest disciples were able to found the monasteries of Ganden (1409), Drepung (1416), and Sera (1419). In 1414 the gongma invited Tsongkhapa to teach the tenets of his school (later known as Gelugpa) in Drashi Dokha. A monk from Tsang called Gedun Drub attended the sermons and subsequently became a disciple of Tsongkhapa; he would later be counted as the First Dalai Lama. In 1409 the gongma and his minister Neu Namkha Zangpo enabled Tsongkhapa to arrange the first Monlam festival in Lhasa. This three-weeks long prayer festival was subsequently held once a year and attracted many thousands of pilgrims and monks. However, the king was not solely supportive of the Gelugpa school, but listened to a wide array of divines, including the Gelugpa's later rival Karmapa.

== Demise ==
Gongma Drakpa Gyaltsen died in 1432 after 47 years on the throne. His death was only noted by the Ming court in 1440. At his demise he was succeeded by his nephew Drakpa Jungne, whose mother belonged to the powerful feudatory family Rinpungpa in Tsang. However, dynastic turmoil and localism among the regional lords led to a breakdown of Phagmodrupa power three years after the accession of the new king.

== See also ==
- History of Tibet
- Sino-Tibetan relations during the Ming dynasty
- Kagyu

Preceded by Sonam Drakpa	Ruler of Tibet; 1385–1432	Succeeded by Drakpa Jungne
