= 1491 =

1491 in various calendars
- Gregorian calendar: 1491; MCDXCI
- Ab urbe condita: 2244
- Armenian calendar: 940; ԹՎ ՋԽ
- Assyrian calendar: 6241
- Balinese saka calendar: 1412–1413
- Bengali calendar: 897–898
- Berber calendar: 2441
- English Regnal year: 6 Hen. 7 – 7 Hen. 7
- Buddhist calendar: 2035
- Burmese calendar: 853
- Byzantine calendar: 6999–7000
- Chinese calendar: 庚戌年 (Metal Dog); 4188 or 3981 — to — 辛亥年 (Metal Pig); 4189 or 3982
- Coptic calendar: 1207–1208
- Discordian calendar: 2657
- Ethiopian calendar: 1483–1484
- Hebrew calendar: 5251–5252
- Hindu calendars
- Vikram Samvat: 1547–1548
- Shaka Samvat: 1412–1413
- Kali Yuga: 4591–4592
- Holocene calendar: 11491
- Igbo calendar: 491–492
- Iranian calendar: 869–870
- Islamic calendar: 896–897
- Japanese calendar: Entoku 3 (延徳３年)
- Javanese calendar: 1408–1409
- Julian calendar: 1491; MCDXCI
- Korean calendar: 3824
- Minguo calendar: 421 before ROC 民前421年
- Nanakshahi calendar: 23
- Thai solar calendar: 2033–2034
- Tibetan calendar: ལྕགས་ཕོ་ཁྱི་ལོ་ (male Iron-Dog); 1617 or 1236 or 464 — to — ལྕགས་མོ་ཕག་ལོ་ (female Iron-Boar); 1618 or 1237 or 465

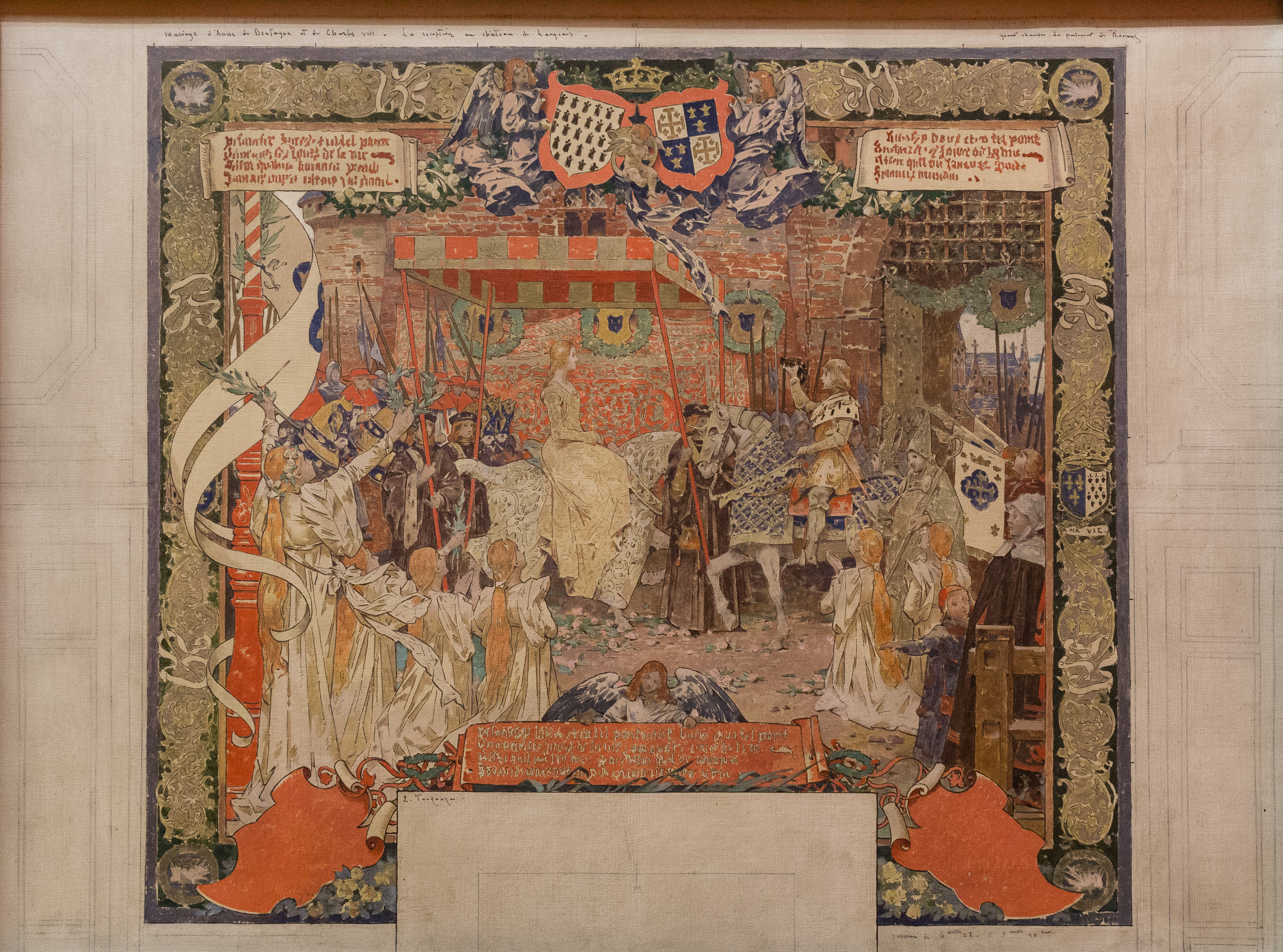
December 6: The completion of the conquest of Brittany by France is effected by the marriage of King Charles VIII to the Duchess Anne.

Year 1491 (MCDXCI) was a common year starting on Saturday of the Julian calendar.

== Events ==
=== January–March ===
- January 2 – After his failed attempt to marry Anne, Duchess of Brittany, Breton General Alain I of Albret signs the Treaty of Moulins and pledges support to King Charles VIII of France in return for the rights to the Breton city of Nantes. The French–Breton War resumes.
- February 2 – At Stettin (now Szczecin in Poland) Bogislaw X, Duke of Pomerania, marries Anna Jagiellon, daughter of King Casimir IV.
- February 13 – A tsunami occurs off of the coast of New Zealand, later believed to be caused by a meteor impact that created what is referred to as the "Mahuika crater" on the New Zealand continental shelf.
- February 20 – Jan I Olbracht, son of King Casimir IV or Poland and, like his older brother Vladislaus, a claimant to the throne of the Kingdom of Hungary, renounces all of his claims in return for the Duchy of Głogów.
- March 19 – Having defected to France, Alain I of Albret captures the Château des ducs de Bretagne, the royal palace of Brittany's capital, Nantes, after the Breton regent, the Marshal Jean IV de Rieux, leads the evacuation of Breton officials.

=== April–June ===
- April 4 King Charles VIII makes a triumphant entry to the city of Nantes, facing no resistance and marking the conquest of the Duchy of Brittany by France.
- April 23 – The city of Granada, capital of the Muslim Emirate of Granada in Spain, is besieged by the armies of Castile and Aragon, ruled by the Catholic Monarchs of Spain, Ferdinand and Isabella.
- May 3 – The ruler of the Kingdom of Kongo, Nkuwu Nzinga, is baptised by Portuguese missionaries, adopting the baptismal name of João I.
- May 8 – A solar eclipse observed in Metz.
- May – The first Ottoman–Mamluk war between the Ottoman Empire and the Egyptian Mamluk Sultanate ends in an Egyptian victory.
- June 27 – Louis of Orléans is released by Charles VIII of France after three years of imprisonment.

=== July–September ===
- July 6 – King João I of Kongo, who had recently converted to Christianity, completes the construction of the first Christian church in sub-Saharan Africa, the Cathedral of the Holy Saviour of Congo (Kulumbimbi), in what is now the city of M'banza-Kongo in Angola.
- July 8 – In what is now Tibet in the People's Republic of China, Tsokye Dorje becomes the new ruler of the Buddhist Kingdom of Ü-Tsang upon the death of King Ngagi Wangpo.
- July 13 – Prince Alfonso, the only legitimate son of King João II of Portugal, and heir apparent to the throne, is killed in an accident when the horse he is riding falls and crushes him.
- August 12 – King Henry VII of England summons the members of the English House of Lords and House of Commons to assemble on October 17 at Westminster.
- August 15 – The first Feria de Agosto takes place in the Spanish city of Málaga in celebration of the 1487 conquest of the Granadan city by the Kingdom of Castile. The festival is still celebrated in Spain more than 500 years later.
- September 15 – King Charles VIII of France and the Duchess Anne of Brittany conclude a treaty at Rennes, leading to the breaking of Anne's engagement to Archduke Maximilian of Austria, and an agreement for the marriage of Anne to Charles.
- September – At the battle of Vrpile Gulch in southern Croatia, the armies of the Ottoman Empire are defeated by those of the Kingdom of Croatia.

=== October–December ===
- October 17 – The English Parliament assembles at Westminster, and Richard Empson is elected as Speaker of the House of Commons.
- October 27 – King Charles VIII of France convenes the Estates of Brittany in Vannes, to counsel Anne of Brittany of France's conditions for keeping her as Duchess, including the occupation of the Duchy of Brittany by the French army, the appointment of the Viscount Jean de Rohan to be appointed as governor-general of Brittany on behalf of the King of France, the renunciation of Anne's proxy marriage to the Archduke Maximilian of Austria, and the future marriage of Anne to the French King.
- November 7 – Maximilian I, Holy Roman Emperor and King Vladislaus II of Bohemia and Hungary sign the Peace of Pressburg, formally ending the Austrian–Hungarian War.
- November 15 – To end the siege of Rennes, the remaining portion of the Duchy of Brittany still under control of the Breton royal family, the Duchess Anne signs the Treaty of Rennes and agrees to marry King Charles VIII.
- November 16 – An auto-da-fé held in Brasero de la Dehesa (outside Ávila) concludes the case of the Holy Child of La Guardia, with the execution of several Jewish and converso suspects.
- November 23 – Anne of Brittany annuls her marriage contract with the Archduke Maximilian of Austria and is formally engaged to be married to King Charles VIII of France.
- November 25 – Completing the Reconquista (the "reconquest"), The Granada War is effectively brought to an end (and the Siege of Granada extended for two months) with the signing of the Treaty of Granada between the Catholic Monarchs of Spain and the Moorish Emir of Granada.
- November – The pretender Perkin Warbeck begins a campaign to take the English throne, with a landing in Ireland.
- December 6 – King Charles VIII of France marries the Duchess Anne of Brittany, forcing her to break her marriage contract with Maximilian I, Holy Roman Emperor, and incorporating the Duchy of Brittany into the kingdom of France.
- December 21 – The Truce of Coldstream secures a five-year peace between Scotland and England.
- December 24 – The Black Army of Hungary and its Bohemian Czech allies, commanded by Stephen Zápolya, defeats Duke Jan II Olbracht at the Battle of Presov in what is now Slovakia.

=== Date unknown ===
- In the Ayutthaya Kingdom the reign of Ramathibodi II begins.
- The population of China reaches 56.238 million.
- The Bread and Cheese Revolt breaks out in West Frisia, North Holland, caused by a famine among the peasants due to bad weather conditions.
- A major fire breaks out in Dresden.
- In the Russian territory of Komi (the modern-day Komi Republic), annexed by Russia in 1478, copper and silver ores are discovered, and the territory gains importance as a mining and metallurgical center.
- Nicolaus Copernicus enters the University of Kraków

== Births ==
- January 30 – Francesco Sforza, Italian noble (d. 1512)
- March 25 – Marie d'Albret, Countess of Rethel, French nobility (d. 1549)
- May 10 – Suzanne, Duchess of Bourbon suo jure, French nobility (d. 1521)
- June 28 – Henry VIII, king of England (d. 1547)
- August 3 – Maria of Jülich-Berg, spouse of John III, Duke of Cleves (d. 1543)
- August 10 – Queen Janggyeong, Korean royal consort (d. 1515)
- August 25 – Innocenzo Cybo, Catholic cardinal (d. 1550)
- October 6 – Francis de Bourbon, Count of St. Pol, French noble (d. 1545)
- c. October 23 – Ignatius of Loyola, Spanish founder of the Society of Jesus, a Roman Catholic religious order (d. 1556)
- October 26 – Zhengde Emperor of China (d. 1521)
- November 8 – Teofilo Folengo, Italian poet (d. 1544)
- November 11 – Martin Bucer, German Protestant reformer (d. 1551)
- December 13 – Martín de Azpilcueta, Spanish theologian and economist (d. 1586)
- December 31 – Jacques Cartier, French explorer (d. 1557)
- date unknown
  - Lapulapu, Filipino king (d. 1542)
  - Azai Sukemasa, Japanese samurai and warlord (d. 1546)
  - Isabella Losa, Spanish scholar (d. 1564)
- probable
  - George Blaurock, Swiss founder of Anabaptism (d. 1529)
  - Antonio Pigafetta, Italian explorer (d. 1534)

== Deaths ==
- January 19 – Dorothea of Brandenburg, Duchess of Mecklenburg (b. 1420)
- February 15 – Ashikaga Yoshimi, brother of Shōgun Ashikaga Yoshimasa (b. 1439)
- February 19 – Enno I of East Frisia (1466–1491) (b. 1460)
- March 6 – Richard Woodville, 3rd Earl Rivers
- March 31 – Bonaventura Tornielli, Italian Roman Catholic priest (b. 1411)
- May 14 – Filippo Strozzi the Elder, Italian banker (b. 1428)
- July 13 – Afonso, Hereditary Prince of Portugal (b. 1475)
- July 16 – William Herbert, 2nd Earl of Pembroke, English earl (b. 1451)
- October 5 – Jean Balue, French cardinal and statesman (b. c. 1421)
- October 12 – Fritz Herlen, German artist (b. 1449)
- November 16 – Holy Child of La Guardia, Spanish folk saint (b. n/a)
- December 28 – Bertoldo di Giovanni, Italian sculptor (b. c. 1435)
- date unknown – Anne of Orléans, Abbess of Fontevraud (b. 1464)
- date unknown – Musa ibn Abi al-Ghassan, knight of Granada
- probable
  - February 9 (according to the Libro dei Morti) – Antonia di Paolo di Dono, Italian artist and daughter of Paolo di Dono
