= Norzang =

1st Rinpunga Tibetan ruler (1403–1466)

Norzang (1403–1466), in full Norbu Zangpo (Tibetan: ཎོར་བུ་བཟང་པོ, Wylie: Nor bu bzang po), was the founder of the power of the Rinpungpa Dynasty in Central Tibet.

== Religious activities ==
Norzang was the son of Namkha Gyalpo, the chief of the Rinpung fief in Tsang (West Central Tibet). His grandfather Namkha Gyaltsen, the founder of the line, married a sister of the Phagmodrupa ruler Drakpa Gyaltsen. Namkha Gyalpo was one of the principal ministers of the Phagmodrupa dynasty, and the patron of the Tsangrong monastery. Norzang inherited his functions at the early age of eleven and completed the construction of the Chamchen temple. In religious matters he favoured the Sakya and Kagyud sects of Buddhism. According to a somewhat doubtful story a Sakya cleric, the Choje of Ngor, gave religious instructions to Norzang in return for the promise that the Rinpung lord would fulfil three wishes of the Choje. These were to force all members of the rival Geden sect to yield to Sakya, to put an end to the construction of a monastery directed by Gedun Drub (posthumously counted as the first Dalai Lama), and to supply provisions for the female servants of the new monastery at Ngor. Norzang refused the requests since they would cause disturbances.

== Taking power ==
When the king Drakpa Gyaltsen died in 1432 the succession of the Phagmodrupa throne was in doubt. The influential Norzang recommended that a revered abbot who was a member of the dynasty, the Chenga of Thel, should make the decision. The latter pointed out Drakpa Jungne, nephew of the deceased ruler. In 1434 the old Chenga himself died and the Phagmodrupa were wrecked by a violent internal conflict when Drakpa Jungne's father Sangye Gyaltsen tried to secure power at the expense of his own son. The disturbances enabled the Rinpungpa to take control over the strategic town Shigatse in Tsang in 1435 (or, according to recent research, in 1446 when there was a Phagmodrupa interregnum). The place was later on headed by Norzang's son Dondup Dorje. Seeing this as an act of open defiance against the Phagmodrupa, the elites of Tsang began to ally with the Rinpungpa. Norzang brought various Tibetan petty princes under his authority.

== Later years ==
In spite of the violent expansion of Norzang's power, he continued to pay formal homage to the Phagmodrupa monarchs Drakpa Jungne (1432–45) and Kunga Lekpa (1448–81). A Rinpungpa lady was given to Kunga Lekpa as his wife. However, the marriage was unhappy, and Kunga Lekpa felt dissatisfied with Norzang's behaviour when he made a tour in Tsang. Norzang and his brother Rinchen Palzang married the Phagmodrupa princess Yeshe Tsogyal, daughter of Sangye Rinchen, thus following the Tibetan practice of polyandry. He or his brother sired three sons in this marriage, namely Upasika (b. 1444), Kunzang (1445–c. 1479), and Dondup Dorje (b. 1447). By a different woman he begot Tsokye Dorje (1450–1510) and Shakya Gyaltsen (1456–1488). He died in 1466, and his death caused a temporary downturn in the fortunes of the Rinpungpa.

| Preceded by none | Ruler of Tsang; 1435–1466 | Succeeded by Kunzang |
