= Ngawang Tashi Drakpa =

10th Phagmodrupa Tibetan ruler (1488–1564)

Ngawang Tashi Drakpa (Tibetan: ངག་དབང་བཀྲ་ཤིས་གྲགས་པ, Wylie: Ngag dbang bkra shis grags pa, 1488–1564) was a king of Tibet who ruled in 1499–1554 and 1556/57–1564. He belonged to the Phagmodrupa dynasty which was the dominating regime in Tibet from 1354 to 1435 and maintained a degree of authority until the early 17th century. His rule is sometimes considered to be the last of importance in the history of the dynasty.

== Political background ==
The earliest years of Ngawang Tashi Drakpa's life was also a time when the political authority of the Phagmodrupa regime was at its nadir. The dynasty originally wielded strong executive power over Central Tibet (Ü and Tsang), but after 1435 the various fiefs gained an autonomous position. In particular the royal court in Nêdong was overshadowed by the Rinpungpa family, whose principal stronghold was Samdrubtse (Shigatse in Tsang, West Central Tibet). This family acted as patrons to the Karmapa lama, whose religious influence in Ü (East Central Tibet) was greatly enhanced when the Rinpungpa captured Lhasa in 1498. The ties between Karmapa and Rinpungpa were not unconditional, however, since the former did not wish to see their activities and decisions determined by a secular hegemon. Later on, this led the Karmapa and Shamarpa hierarchs to support a revival of Phagmodrupa power.

== Troubled childhood ==
Ngawang Tashi Drakpa was born in 1488 as the only son of King Ngagi Wangpo and his consort Lady Dsongkhama. His mother died when he was only one year old, followed by the father in 1491. Due to his minority a regent was appointed at the Nêdong court. The person chosen was Tsokye Dorje, a member of the increasingly powerful Rinpungpa. In 1499, after a turbulent regency, Tsokye Dorje handed over powers to Ngawang Tashi Drakpa who was enthroned as king (gongma, "the high one", "superior"). Five years later the young ruler married a Rinpungpa lady out of political expediency. This consort, Legtso Gyalmo, bore him two sons, namely Drowai Gonpo (1508–1548) and Drakpa Jungne (1508–1570). He later married Sangye Pal Dzomma of the house of Nelpa, a strong-willed woman who actively assisted her husband in expanding their common power base. She was, in a modern assessment, "one of the most powerful and fascinating female rulers in Tibet".

== The Phagmodrupa restoration ==
The years around 1500 saw the summit of Rinpungpa authority in the central parts of Tibet. The leader of the family was Donyo Dorje, a nephew of the ex-regent Tsokye Dorje. His allegiance to the Karmapa hierarch Chödrak Gyatso led him to harass the monks of the Gelugpa sect (the Yellow Hats) in the Lhasa area. The Karmapa and Shamarpa hierarchs nevertheless strove to consolidate the authority of the young Ngawang Tashi Drakpa. In 1510, just after the death of the ex-regent Tsokye Dorje, a conflict escalated between Donyo Dorje and Ngawang Tashi Namgyal. After the demise of Donyo Dorje in 1512, the fortunes of the Rinpungpa eventually began to wane. In a long series of petty wars over the next years, the gongma and his allies pushed back the Rinpungpa positions. In 1517 the latter lost control over Lhasa. The gongma now resolved to increase his religious network by lifting the restrictions of the Gelugpa, without antagonizing the Karmapa. In the next year the Monlam (prayer) festival could be celebrated in Lhasa by the Gelugpa monks, for the first time in twenty years. They had previously been impeded from participating by the Rinpungpa troops. Queen Sangye Pal Dzomma was a main sponsor of the festival, and had close contacts with the Second Dalai Lama, the leading Gelugpa figure. The power of the Rinpungpa was henceforth mainly restricted to Tsang. The historical sources give a generally favourable image of Ngawang Tashi Drakpa and his queen, as being successful in warfare and great patrons of all the major religious sites in the Lhasa area. In his chronicle The Song of the Spring Queen, the Fifth Dalai Lama calls him King of Tibet, although this epithet must be qualified. The outlying areas Ngari, Amdo and Kham seem to have been outside his political network, and Tsang did not generally obey his authority.

== Relationship with China ==
Since ancient times, the Phagmodrupa dynasty stood in a nominal tribute relationship with China. Emperors would confer titles and gifts to new rulers, but did not intervene in the internal affairs of Central Tibet. The dynastic annals of the Ming dynasty, the Mingshi, are fairly vague on Tibetan politics in this era. They complain about violence committed by monks bringing tribute in the Yangzhou district in 1495. The court of Beijing sent envoys with an admonition to the Phagmodrupa ruler to punish the monks. Arriving to Tibet they heard that the former ruler Kunga Lekpa had died (actually back in 1481 according to Tibetan chronicles), and that his "son" (actually nephew) Ngagi Wangpo asked for investiture. The imperial investiture was brought to Tibet with two monks. At closer inspection it turned out that Ngagi Wangpo was dead as well. The two envoys therefore gave the investiture to his son in turn, whom they called Awang Dashi Daba Jianzan (Ngawang Tashi Drakpa Gyaltsen). The Chinese authorities at home were dissatisfied with the self-willed decision of the envoys, but did not change the state of matters. Intermittent Phagmodrupa tributes continued to be dispatched to the Ming for the rest of Ngawang Tashi Drakpa's long reign. Apart from that a large number of Tibetan local regimes sent tribute, which was in reality a trade exchange; in 1524 these "tributaries" were as many as 37.

== Family disputes ==
By the mid-16th century the physical faculties of Ngawang Tashi Drakpa began to decline. His son Drowai Gonpo (1508–1548) was established as ruler in Gongri Karpo, to the west of Nêdong, and his sons in turn caused trouble for the ageing gongma. Rebellions against the Phagmodrupa ruler took place in 1553-54 and forced him to step down in favour of his grandson Ngawang Drakpa Gyaltsen. New political turmoil erupted in Ü in 1555; eventually a general council was held and Ngawang Tashi Drakpa was returned to power, in 1556 or 1557. These disturbances underpinned the rise to power of a family of feudatories, the Kyishöpa, who resided close to Lhasa. They became the leading political power in the area in the second half of the 16th century. From 1559 the old Ngawang Tashi Drakpa entertained a close relationship with the Third Dalai Lama. The Jiajing Emperor issued a patent in 1562 where a certain Drakpa Tashi Gyaltsen, son of the old ruler, was appointed as his successor since the father was old and sick and unable to run the affairs. This Drakpa Tashi Gyaltsen is otherwise unknown, unless the document alludes to the king's grandson Ngawang Drakpa Gyaltsen of the Gongri Karpo branch of the dynasty. What is known is that Ngawang Drakpa Gyaltsen strove to grab power from the frail monarch. Ngawang Tashi Drakpa eventually died in 1564. Two branches of the family then competed for power, and the mediation of the Dalai Lama was called for. Ngawang Drakpa Gyaltsen was eventually acknowledged as his successor in 1576, but by now the powers of the Phagmodrupa were eclipsed. Although gongmas continued to be appointed up to the early 17th century, the main struggle for power in Tibet was henceforth between the Gelugpa and the Karmapa and their patrons, the Tsangpa.

== See also ==
- History of Tibet
- Sino-Tibetan relations during the Ming dynasty
- Kagyu

| Preceded by Tsokye Dorje | Ruler of Tibet; 1499–1554 | Succeeded by Ngawang Drakpa Gyaltsen |
| Preceded by Ngawang Drakpa Gyaltsen | Ruler of Tibet; 1556/57–1564 | Succeeded by Ngawang Drakpa Gyaltsen |
