= Kunga Lekpa =

7th Phagmodrupa Tibetan ruler (1433–1483)

Kunga Lekpa (Tibetan: ཀུན་དགའ་ལེགས་པ, Wylie: Kun dga legs pa, 1433–1483) was a King of central Tibet who ruled from 1448 to 1481. He belonged to the Phagmodrupa dynasty, which was the leading political regime in central Tibet from 1354 to 1435, and retained a certain political status until the early 17th century. His time saw the further fragmentation of Tibetan politics.

== Early years ==
Kunga Lekpa was a son of Sangye Gyaltsen, a brother of the last effective ruler of the dynasty, Gongma Drakpa Gyaltsen. His mother was Dzompama, a lady of the important Rinpungpa family. During the reign of his brother Drakpa Jungne (1432–1445), the central power of the Phagmodrupa broke down, and the Rinpungpa lord Norzang (d. 1466) acquired a leading position in the Tsang region (West Central Tibet). When Drakpa Jungne died in 1445, there was a three-year interregnum. The young Kunga Lekpa was elevated to abbot of the Tsethang monastery in 1446, and was eventually enthroned as king (gongma, "the high one") in 1448 by a council of ministers. He resided in the Nêdong palace in Ü (East Central Tibet) with Konchok Rinchen as his chief deputy.

== Conflicting Tibetan and Chinese accounts ==
His father Sangye Gyaltsen was still alive, and resided in the Tsethang monastery. He only died in 1457. But in the Mingshi or Chinese dynastic annals the succession is given differently than in the Tibetan chronicles. They assert that the father Sangerjie Jianzan Ba Cangbu (Sangye Gyaltsen Pal Zangpo) succeeded Drakpa Jungne, and ruled in his own name until 1469. After the latter's death the Chenghua Emperor would have "ordered" his son Gongge Liesiba Zhongnai Lingzhan Jianzan Baer Cangbu (Kunga Lekpa Jungne Rinchen Gyaltsen Pal Zangpo) to accede to the throne. The historiographical discrepancy is not easily explained, and seems to point to the limited Chinese insights in Tibetan affairs. At any rate the princely title (wang) conferred by the Chenghua Emperor was valued enough by the Tibetan elite to merit a mention in the local chronicles.

== Trouble with the Rinpungpa ==
Kunga Lekpa made a tour in Tsang, where his Rinpungpa kinsman Norzang received him in state. However, the king felt dissatisfied with the treatment accorded him. He was married to the Rinpungpa lady Chopel Zangmo, his cousin, but the marriage was unhappy, and caused serious political repercussions. To this was added religiously tainted disputes. Norzang's grandson Donyo Dorje (1463–1512) was a supporter of the Karmapa sect and insisted on building a monastery outside Lhasa, thus within the orbit of Phagmodru authority. However, hostile Gelugpa monks razed the new establishment and almost killed the Karmapa lama Chödrak Gyatso. Finally, in 1480, Donyo Dorje invaded the Ü region and captured some districts which had hitherto been under Phagmodrupa's control. He also forced the deputy Konchok Rinchen from power. A renewed attack in the next year was unsuccessful, but by now Kunga Lekpa had lost much of his allegiance among the Tibetan elite. The ministers of the kingdom met in the same year 1481 in Nêdong to discuss the conflict between the gongma's faction and the Rinpungpa. In the end Kunga Lekpa was deposed and received an estate as compensation. The throne went to his nephew Ngagi Wangpo. Two years after this, the old ruler died. He had a son called Rinchen Dorje (1458?-1476?) who became abbot of Tsethang in 1467, but died at a young age. He is sometimes listed as ruler after Kunga Lekpa, which appears to be incorrect.

== See also ==
- History of Tibet
- Sino-Tibetan relations during the Ming dynasty
- Kagyu

Preceded by Drakpa Jungne	Ruler of Tibet; 1448–1481	Succeeded by Ngagi Wangpo
