= Drakpa Jungne =

6th Phagmodrupa Tibetan ruler (1414–1445)

Drakpa Jungne (Tibetan: གྲགས་པ་འབྱུང་གནས, Wylie: Grags pa byung gnas, 1414–1445) was a king of central Tibet who ruled in 1432–1445. He belonged to the Phagmodrupa dynasty which was the leading regime in Tibet from 1354 to 1435, and exerted some influence until the early 17th century. His reign saw the collapse of the political power of the dynasty, and the beginning of two centuries of internal strife.

== Succession ==
Drakpa Jungne was a son of Sangye Gyaltsen, a brother of the former king Drakpa Gyaltsen, who had enjoyed a long and prosperous reign over the central parts of Tibet. Sangye Gyaltsen married two ladies who belonged to the regional vassal family Rinpungpa. By each wife he begot a son, of whom Drakpa Jungne was the eldest, born to lady Kunga Pal Dzomma. After the death of Drakpa Gyaltsen, the ministers could not reach an agreement about the succession. The Rinpungpa lord, Norzang, suggested that the abbot of the Thel monastery should decide, and he pointed out the 18-year-old Drakpa Jungne, who had formerly been a lama of the Tsethang monastery. Although Sangye Gyaltsen had his own designs on the throne, he accepted the advice of the abbot, and his son was enthroned.

== Internal war and dynastic decline ==
After two years, in 1434, the abbot of Thel died, and his moral influence vanished. The father of the young ruler, Sangye Gyaltsen, now claimed the throne. The result was a civil war lasting about one year. 1434 became known as "the year of internal collapse of the Phagmodrupa". Sangye Gyaltsen was pushed back and had to flee to Yargyab. The Rinpungpa lord Norzang came out as the winner in the affair. According to later historiography Norzang's son Dondup Dorje took hold of the important stronghold Samdrubtse (present Shigatse) in 1435. More recent research indicates that Samdrubtse was captured in 1446, at a time when there was a Phagmodrupa interregnum. At any rate the Rinpungpa family came to increasingly dominate the Tsang region, which they would hold until 1565.

== Later reign ==
Nevertheless, the Rinpungpa let their young kinsman remain on the throne, though his immediate influence was now restricted to Ü (East Central Tibet). Due to the hard times, Drakpa Jungne was unable to tour the fiefs in Tsang. The king took some interest in the moral discipline of his people, and promulgated restrictions about prostitution and the drinking of chhaang. He was "a man of deep spirituality and well-versed in mantrayana but with a parochial outlook and not cut out for worldly affairs". A tapestry tangka made in the name of Drakpa Jungne has been preserved, and might have been used at his formal enthronement. Unlike the previous practice which prescribed celibacy for the Phagmodru leaders, Drakpa Jungne married with Zomdrak Wangjam of the Kharpa family and sired a son, Ngagi Wangpo who would become ruler much later. At his death in 1445, Drakpa Jungne was succeeded by his half-brother Kunga Lekpa.

== See also ==
- History of Tibet
- Sino-Tibetan relations during the Ming dynasty
- Kagyu

Preceded by Drakpa Gyaltsen	Ruler of Tibet; 1432–1445	Succeeded by Kunga Lekpa
