= Sonam Drakpa =

4th Phagmodrupa Tibetan ruler (1359-1408)

Sonam Drakpa (Tibetan: བསོད་ནམས་གྲགས་པ, Wylie: bSod-nams grags-pa, 1359–1408) was a regent of Central Tibet who ruled in 1381–1385. He belonged to the Phagmodrupa dynasty, the leading regime in Tibet from 1354 to 1435.

== Tenure as abbot and regent ==
Sonam Drakpa was the son of Rinchen Dorje, a brother of the regent Jamyang Shakya Gyaltsen. At the age of nine he was elevated to abbot of the Tsethang monastery, succeeding his eldest brother Drakpa Rinchen. In 1381 he took the dignity of regent (desi) of Tibet after the abdication of his other brother Drakpa Changchub. His short rule was considered by the Tibetans to be particularly prosperous, with excellent crops. He was therefore known as "the Fortunate King".

== Pushed from power ==
The Hongwu Emperor of the Ming dynasty conferred the title Guanding Guoshi on Sonam Drakpa, who is called Sonan Jiasibayi Jian Cangbu in the dynastic annals. That the Ming dynasty had limited insight in Tibetan affairs at this time is indicated by the erroneous statement that Sonam Drakpa directly succeeded his uncle Jamyang Shakya Gyaltsen. Nevertheless, the Chinese titles conferred on various Tibetan lords were evidently valued since they are also mentioned in Tibetan chronicles. In 1385 Sonam Drakpa was forced to abdicate his political powers under murky circumstances. Another branch of the family grabbed power, supported by certain ministers and feudatories. Sonam Drakpa sent a letter to the Hongwu Emperor, claiming that he was ill and therefore suggested his cousin Drakpa Gyaltsen as his successor. This was endorsed by the Chinese emperor. The abdicated regent withdrew to the monastery Thel. In 1405 he became a kunpang, a person who completely renounces the world. Three years later he died.

== See also ==
- History of Tibet
- Sino-Tibetan relations during the Ming dynasty
- Kagyu

Preceded by Drakpa Changchub	Ruler of Tibet; 1381–1385	Succeeded by Drakpa Gyaltsen
