= Rinpungpa =

Tibetan regime in 1435 to 1565

Rinpungpa རིན་སྤུངས་པ་
- 1435–1565
- Capital: Shigatse
- Common languages: Tibetan
- Religion: Tibetan Buddhism
- Government: Theocracy
- Monarch
  - 1435－1466: Norzang (first)
  - 1479－1512: Donyo Dorje
  - 1547－1565: Ngawang Jigme Drakpa (last)
- History
  - Established: 1435
  - Disestablished: 1565
Preceded by	Succeeded by
Phagmodrupa dynasty	Tsangpa
- Today part of: China

Rinpungpa (Tibetan: ཪིན་སྤུངས་པ་, Wylie: rin spungs pa) was a Tibetan dynastic regime that dominated much of Western Tibet between 1435 and 1565. During one period around 1500 the Rinpungpa lords came close to assembling the Tibetan lands around the Yarlung Tsangpo River under one authority, but their powers receded after 1512.

== Rise to power ==
The Rinpungpa belonged to the Gar (Wylie: sger) clan, which is traced back to the days of the Tibetan Empire. One of their line, Namkha Gyaltsen, served as nanglon (minister of internal affairs) under the Phagmodrupa ruler Jamyang Shakya Gyaltsen, who held power over Ü-Tsang. He was appointed dzongpon (governor) of the fief Rinpung in Rong, a region in Tsang in an unknown year before 1373. His political position was strengthened by the marriage with the Phagmodrupa princess Sönam Palmö. Their daughter in turn was given in marriage to Sangye Gyaltsen, a Phagmodrupa prince, and gave birth to the later ruler Drakpa Jungne (r. 1432–1445). The son of Namkha Gyaltsen was Namkha Gyalpo who took over the Rinpung estate at the age of 14 and held a number of ministerial positions. He was succeeded in 1413 by his young son Norzang, a strong personality who expanded the fortunes of the family on a Tibet-wide level. He increased his control over territories in Shang, Tag, Ling and Kyur and was the patron of the Jamchen Monastery, founded in 1427. He also founded the Kyemotsal Monastery in Dzongkar in 1437.

The Rinpungpa took advantage of a family feud within the Phagmodrupa dynasty in 1434. With the united troops from Rong and Shang, Norzang seized the important place Samdrubtse, modern Shigatse, from the governor of the Chonggye family. This is traditionally said to have taken place in 1435, though the more likely date is 1446. Samdrubtse was a very strategic spot and the key to power over Tsang. In the following years Norzang expanded his influence over Tsang, Rong and Shang. His kinsman, the Phagmodrupa king Kunga Lekpa (r. 1448–1481) was born from a Rinpung princess and in turn married a Rinpungpa daughter. He was not able to stop the advances of his powerful vassal. Norzang himself married Kunga Lekpa's sister, further emphasizing the elaborated net of kinship ties between the two families. While still acknowledging the Phagmodrupa, the Rinpungpa subsequently built up a strong position, bearing the title desi (regent).

== Confrontation and invasion ==
The increasing importance of the Buddhist sects in this period made it crucial for secular rulers to seek support from religious networks. In Tibetan historiography the members of the family are famous as the patrons of the Karma Kagyu school of Buddhism, which was sometimes opposed to the Gelugpa. However, the early Rinpungpa lords supported other sects such as Sakya and its important philosopher Gorampa. After the death of Norzang in 1466 the fortunes of the Rinpungpa took a downturn for a while under his obscure son Kunzang. This person died in the 1470s and was succeeded by Donyo Dorje, the most powerful figure of the line. While pursuing an aggressive and warlike policy to achieve domination over Central Tibet, he also stood out as a religious patron. Thus he sponsored the foundation of the Yangpachen Monastery for the Shamarpa hierarch of the Karma Kagyu sect. This included comprehensive economic dispositions; 2,800 nomadic households were donated to the Shamarpa for providing butter-lamp offerings, and all the monks of Yangpachen were granted a daily measure of barley. His policy towards the Phagmodrupa was one of confrontation. The king Kunga Lekpa lived in a conflict-ridden marriage with the Rinpung princess, which added to the rift. Her kinsman Donyo Dorje eventually invaded the central domain of the king in 1480. In the following year a conference was convened in the Phagmodrupa capital Nêdong where the Rinpung princes participated. In the end Kunga Lekpa was forced to abdicate in favour of a nephew, a relative non-entity.

== Height of political authority ==
The agreement did not put an end to the endemic political turbulence in Central Tibet. The Rinpungpa proceeded to defeat various regional lords and increase their power. In 1485 they attacked the important estate Gyangtse and captured the lord of Yung. New turbulence arose in 1489 and again allowed the Rinpungpa to keep the upper hand. Two years later Donyo Dorje's uncle Tsokye Dorje took power as regent in the Phagmodrupa seat Nêdong (1491–1499) during the minority of the heir Ngawang Tashi Drakpa. The years around 1500 saw the high tide of Rinpungpa power, and the authority of Donyo Dorje was almost absolute, being supported by the Karmapa and Shamarpa hierarchs. There was also a political expansion to the west. In 1499 the important kingdom of Guge in Ngari (West Tibet) had to acknowledge the Rinpungpa.

== Setbacks in the east ==
Due to pressure from the Rinpungpa, who favoured the Karma Kagyu, the Gelugpa school were forbidden to participate in the new year celebration and the great Monlam ceremony in Lhasa between 1498 and 1517. After the deaths of the powerful princes Tsokye Dorje (1510) and Donyo Dorje (1512), however, the power of the Rinpungpa declined. In spite of Rinpungpa patronage the hierarchs of the Karma Kagyu, Karmapa and Shamarpa, were adverse to being closely controlled by the secular lords. They therefore strove to once again stabilize the long-effaced Phagmodrupa rule. In the early sixteenth century Ngawang Tashi Drakpa of the Phagmodrupa managed to regain a degree of influence, pushing out the new Rinpung lords Zilnonpa and Ngawang Namgyal from Lhasa. He was friendly disposed to the Gelugpa leader Gedun Gyatso (posthumously counted as the second Dalai Lama), which at this stage did not exclude heartily relations with the Karma Kagyu. The direct power of Rinpungpa in Ü (East Central Tibet) was henceforth limited.

== External threats and fall from power ==
An agreement between the factions of Ü and Tsang was reached in 1518. The nominal head of the Rinpungpa, the boy Zilnonpa, asked the king for investiture as dzongpon, and such was given. In fact, however, the Rinpungpa continued to wield power over Tsang on their own accord. The following decades were marked by a confusing succession of clashes and temporary reconciliations between the factions of Central Tibet. In 1532 the Rinpungpa domains were briefly threatened by an invasion by the Muslim general Mirza Muhammad Haidar Dughlat, operating on the orders of Sultan Said Khan, the ruler of Kashgar. The waning of Rinpungpa power was marked by an abortive invasion of the Mangyül Gungthang kingdom in West Tibet in 1555, which was badly defeated. In 1557 one of the retainers of the Rinpungpa, Karma Tseten, who was governor of Shigatse since 1548, rebelled against his lord. In 1565, finally, the learned and cultivated Rinpungpa ruler Ngawang Jigme Drakpa was defeated by Karma Tseten through a surprise attack. In that way Karma Tseten founded the new Tsangpa dynasty which would rule large parts of Central Tibet up to 1642.

The Rinpungpa survived in their heartland Rong and periodically tried to revive their fortune. They staged an abortive attack on Kyishö in Ü in 1575 and quarreled with the Tsangpa ruler in the next few years. After the Tsang-Rong war of 1589 their power was exhausted, and they were forced to capitulate in 1590. Local Rinpungpa princes are known up to the early 17th century.

== Legacy ==
The significance of the Rinpungpa is difficult to assess due to the terseness of the written sources. They upheld political hegemony in Tsang for 120–130 years, but little is known in detail of administrative and economic issues. Their relationship with the Chinese Ming dynasty seems to have been indirect at best. The most detailed account, The New Red Annals (1538), was written by Panchen Sonam Dragpa who extolled the achievements of the Phagmodrupa kings at the expense of the Rinpung lords, who were depicted as a destabilizing, power-hungry force. One may note, however, that their grab of power only began after the Phagmodrupa regime had started to decline due to internal squabbles. The chronicle of the Fifth Dalai Lama, The Song of the Spring Queen (1643), gives a more balanced picture: although sometimes characterized as devious and beset by "fierce pride", the rulers had great cultural and religious interests. They funded new monasteries, commissioned precious artwork such as gilded Buddhas and thangkas, and at least one of them, Ngawang Jigme Drakpa (d. 1597), was a gifted author whose works are still read. The family eventually fell from power for the same reasons as the Phagmodrupa: they had to uphold a fragile balance among autonomous local lords which broke down when a number of dissatisfied elements sided with the new Tsangpa polity.

== List of rulers ==
- Norzang 1435–1466
- Kunzang 1466–c. 1479 (son)
- Donyo Dorje c. 1479–1512 (son)
- Ngawang Namgyal 1512–1544 (son of Tsokye Dorje, a son of Norzang)
- Dondup Tseten Dorje 1544–? (son)
- Ngawang Jigme Drakpa 1547–1565 (brother)

== See also ==
- History of Tibet
- List of rulers of Tibet
- Sino-Tibetan relations during the Ming dynasty
