= Ngagi Wangpo =

8th Phagmodrupa Tibetan ruler (1439-1491)

Ngagi Wangpo (Tibetan: ངག་གི་དབང་པོ, Wylie: Ngag gi dbang po, 1439 – 8 July 1491), also known as Chen-nga Tsenyepa (Wylie: Spyan snga ts'e gnyis pa), was a king of central Tibet who reigned in 1481–1491. He belonged to the Phagmodrupa dynasty, which was the leading regime of central Tibet from 1354 to 1435 and maintained a certain political role until the early 17th century.

== Appointment ==
Ngagi Wangpo was the only son of King Drakpa Jungne and a lady of the Kharpa family. Still a minor at his father's death in 1445, he was made abbot of Thel in 1454. Four years later his uncle, King Kunga Lekpa, himself acquired the abbot-ship of Thel, and Ngagi Wangpo had to stay in a succession of other places. The late 15th century was filled with internal disputes in Central Tibet, and the direct authority of the Phagmodru ruler was at best restricted to Ü (East Central Tibet). In Tsang (West Central Tibet) the Rinpungpa feudatories dominated. In 1481 Kunga Lekpa was deprived of the kingship by a council of ministers, after a series of invasions by Donyo Dorje of Rinpungpa. Instead, his nephew Ngagi Wangpo was invited to take the position as king (gongma, "the high one"). At his enthronement he married Lady Dsongkhama. In 1488, they had a son called Ngawang Tashi Drakpa.

== Continuing internal troubles ==
During his decade-long reign Ngagi Wangpo was honoured by the elites of Central Tibet as their overlord (chipon). Nevertheless, his time was marked by unsafe conditions and rivalry between various parts of the country. In 1485 the Rinpungpa lord Donyo Dorje led an attack on Gyangtse, which was under a Phagmodrupa minister. Three years later the Rinpungpa finally got the upper hand and appropriated Gyangtse. When Ngagi Wangpo died on 8 July 1491 the dominance of the Rinpungpa seemed complete. Donyo Dorje's uncle Tsokye Dorje (d. 1510) took over as regent since the heir to the throne was merely a small boy. The Ming dynasty of China by this time had only the faintest knowledge of internal Tibetan politics, since they noted the accession and subsequent death of Ngagi Wangpo in 1495; they knew the king by the name Ban Aji Jiangdong Daba.

== See also ==
- History of Tibet
- Sino-Tibetan relations during the Ming dynasty
- Kagyu

Preceded by Kunga Lekpa	Ruler of Tibet; 1481–1491	Succeeded by Tsokye Dorje
