= Drakpa Changchub =

3rd Phagmodrupa Tibetan ruler (1356–1386)

Drakpa Changchub (Tibetan: གྲགས་པ་བྱང་ཆུབ, Wylie: Grags pa byang chub, 1356–1386) was a ruler of Central Tibet in 1374–1381. He belonged to the Phagmodrupa dynasty which was the dominating regime in Tibet between 1354 and 1435. Drakpa Changchub was the second son of Rinchen Dorje, a brother of the preceding regent Jamyang Shakya Gyaltsen. His mother was Zina Tashi Kyi. Like the other Phagmodrupa rulers he had a monastic upbringing, and was made abbot of Dansa Thel when fifteen years of age. In 1374 he was appointed regent (desi) of Tibet shortly after the demise of his uncle. For the next seven years he was jointly lama and regent. In 1381 he abdicated his political powers and retired to Dansa Thel in order to teach tantras. Since his reign was quite brief he was never formally acknowledged by the emperor of the Ming dynasty. He was succeeded as regent by his younger half-brother Sonam Drakpa.

== See also ==
- History of Tibet
- Sino-Tibetan relations during the Ming dynasty
- Kagyu

Preceded by Jamyang Shakya Gyaltsen	Ruler of Tibet; 1374–1381	Succeeded by Sonam Drakpa
