= Ngawang Drakpa Gyaltsen =

11th Phagmodrupa Tibetan ruler (1554–1556/1557) (1576–1603/1604)

Ngawang Drakpa (Gyaltsen) (Tibetan: ངག་དབང་གྲགས་པ་རྒྱལ་མཚན, Wylie: Ngag dbang grags pa rgyal mts'an, d. 1603 or 1604) was a king in Central Tibet who ruled from 1554 to 1556/57, and again from 1576 to 1603/04. He belonged to the Phagmodrupa dynasty which held power in Tibet or parts of it from 1354 to the early 17th century. Due to the internal family feuds that preceded his reign most of the powers of his predecessor slipped from his hands.

== Rising against his grandfather ==
Ngawang Drakpa Gyaltsen was the son of Drowai Gonpo (1508–1548), a sub-ruler who resided in Gongri Karpo to the south-west of Lhasa. His grandfather was Ngawang Tashi Drakpa (1488–1564), the last effective king of the Phagmodrupa line. The main palace of the dynasty was Nêdong southeast of Lhasa. In 1554 Ngawang Drakpa Gyaltsen temporarily took over the throne of his old grandfather, when the latter was forced to step down for a while. However, new turmoil broke out in Central Tibet in 1555. A council was headed by the religious hierarchs of Drigung Kagyu and Shamarpa, and it was decided to put the old ex-king back on the throne. Ngawang Drakpa Gyaltsen had to return to Gongri Karpo. Some years later he rose against the 75-year-old ruler and tried to acquire the throne permanently. He was aided in his ambitions by the ruler of Ganden. He also kept good relations with Sonam Gyatso, later known as the Third Dalai Lama. A number of Buddhist dignitaries tried to intervene in the rebellion, to no avail. In the next year 1564, his grandfather died. New disturbances broke out between the Nêdong and Gongri Karpo branches of the dynasty. Sonam Gyatso was asked to mediate in the conflict. Eventually Ngawang Drakpa Gyaltsen became the new gongma or king in 1576. However, the executive authority of the Phagmodrupa was now almost depleted. Nevertheless, the Phagmodrupa still filled a role as a focal point around which politics in Ü (East Central Tibet) revolved and different groups balanced each other. Conditions in this part of Tibet tended to be relatively peaceful in the decades of the late sixteenth century, and relations between the main religious sects Karmapa and Gelugpa were amiable for the moment.

== Contacts with Altan Khan ==
The Chinese dynastic annals, the Mingshi, assert that a new Phagmodrupa ruler sought investiture from the Emperor in 1564, but in fact China had very little interest in Tibet at this time. According to the Mingshi a certain Phagmodrupa ruler called Tashi Zangpo ruled after 1579. However, indigenous Tibetan sourced indicate that Ngawang Drakpa Gyaltsen reigned from 1576 until his death in 1603 or 1604. The Chinese might have been ill-informed about local affairs. On the other hand, there was an intense interest from the Tümed Mongols to make contact with the religious leaders of Central Tibet. In 1577 envoys from the Tümed leader Altan Khan arrived to Sonam Gyatso, with an invitation to visit him in Kokonor. Ngawang Drakpa Gyaltsen was supportive of the project, and sent representatives to accompany Sonam Gyatso on his journey. The result of the visit was that the Gelugpa sect established lasting relations with the Mongols, and that their leader acquired the title Dalai Lama.

== Relations with Dalai Lama and demise ==
Although the Phagmodrupa led a Kagyu school of Buddhism, Ngawang Drakpa Gyaltsen supported Sonam Gyatso and the Gelugpa. The Fifth Dalai Lama (1617–1682) wrote enthusiastically in his chronicles about the gongma: "He was particularly a devotee both of the Gelugpa and of the Drukpa and heard [from them] many holy teachings. As his thoughts had been purified, because he was bound to the omniscient Sonam Gyatso by the links which pass between a chaplain and a giver of oblations, similar to those uniting the moon and the sun, the Chinese Emperor's court was constantly sending offerings to Gong[ri] Kar[po]." In 1601 the Phagmodrupa sent a representative with a delegation of Gelugpa dignitaries that journeyed to Mongolia. The delegation received the young Fourth Dalai Lama, Yonten Gyatso, who was a Mongol prince, and brought him to Tibet. Ngawang Drakpa Gyaltsen died a few years later, in late 1603 or early 1604. He had two sons called Kagyud Nampar Gyalwa (d. 1623) and Namgyal Drakpa (d. 1590). However, for unknown reasons a scion of the rival Kyormolung line of the dynasty took over the by now insignificant title. This was Mipham Wanggyur Gyalpo, possibly a grandson of his half-brother Namgyal Rabten.

== See also ==
- Sino-Tibetan relations during the Ming dynasty
- History of Tibet

Preceded by Ngawang Tashi Drakpa	Ruler in Tibet; 1554–1556/57	Succeeded by Ngawang Tashi Drakpa
Preceded by Ngawang Tashi Drakpa	Ruler in Tibet; 1576–1603/04	Succeeded by Mipham Wanggyur Gyalpo
