= Tibetan Empire (disambiguation) =

The term Tibetan Empire most commonly refers to the first major Tibetan state, ruled by the Yarlung dynasty.

Tibetan Empire may also refer to:

- Phagmodrupa dynasty (1354 – approx. 1618), whose rulers styled themselves ghongma or "emperor"
- Any of the various Tibetan polities that ruled the area, or the Mongol or Chinese empires that claimed overlordship over it, during the history of Tibet
