= 1964 Tibetan Parliament in Exile election =

On February 20, 1964, the second parliamentary election for the Tibetan Parliament in Exile was held. It was the second time Tibetans in exile were able to choose their representatives. Three seats were separated specifically for women as an especial request from the Dalai Lama and the number of representatives was increased from 14 to 17. The four classic schools of Tibetan Buddhism were represented as the three historical regions of Tibet; U-Tsang, Kham and Ando.

== Composition ==
Seat	Member	Representation
1 President	Jheshong Tsewang Tamdin	Sakya
2 Vice President	Samkhar Tsering Wangdu	Ü-Tsang
3	Ratoe Chuwar Trulku	Dalai Lama Appointed
4	Pelyul Zongna Trulku Jampel Lodoe	Nyingma
5	Loling Tsachag Lobsang Kyenrab	Gelug
6	Lodoe Choedhen	Kagyu
7	Ngawang Choesang	Ü-Tsang
8	Phartsang Chukhor Kalsang Damdul	
9	Tengring Rinchen Dolma	
10	Jagoetsang Namgyal Dorje	Kham (Dhotoe)
11	Yabtsang Dechen Dolma	
12	Sadutsang Lobsang Nyandak	
13	Jangtsatsang Tsering Gonpo	Appointed Minister, replaced by Drawu Pon Rinchen Tsering
14	Kirti Jamyang Sonam	Amdo (Dhomey)
15	Tongkhor Trulku Lobsang Jangchub	
16	Taklha Tsering Dolma	
17	Kongtsa Jampa Choedak	
