= Ngawang Jigme Drakpa =

6th Rinpunga Tibetan ruler (?-1597)

Ngawang Jigme Drakpa (Tibetan: ཎགག་དབང་ཨཇིགས་མེད་གྲགས་པ, Wylie: Ngag dbang ajigs med grags pa) (died 1597) was the last ruling prince of Tsang (West Central Tibet) of the Rinpungpa Dynasty. He was also a renowned author. His increasingly chaotic reign ended in 1565, when the Tsangpa dynasty deprived the Rinpungpa of their main possessions.

== Early years ==
Ngawang Jigme Drakpa was the third son of the Rinpungpa prince Ngawang Namgyal. The chronological tables of Sumpa Khanpo allege that he was born in the Water-Tiger year 1482, which is unlikely. According to his own account, his youth was not entirely happy: he grew up with great intellectual interests but was left without attention by his highly revered father, and was not entrusted with administrative responsibilities. The eldest living brother Dondup Tseten Dorje may have taken over the possessions of his father at the latter's death in 1544 (or later). The details of the succession are however obscure since another brother called Rinchen Wanggyal is said to have been entrusted with the rulership when their father was still alive. Dondup Tseten Dorje himself is not known for political activity after the mid 16th century, although he bore the titles miwang (prince) and desi (regent) until his death in 1620.

== Literary activity ==
In an autobiographical text Ngawang Jigme Drakpa relates that he and his other brother Rinchen Wanggyal occupied the important stronghold Samdrubtse in Tsang in 1547. It is not clear from whom the fortress was taken. He was then installed as the ruler of that place, although subservient to Rinchen Wanggyal. After having ruled for some time he ran into trouble and was beset by enemies, but was saved by the intervention of his brother, who appears to have died in 1554. He was counted as the main Rinpungpa ruler of Tsang by the 1560s. Being a well-respected and accomplished scholar he translated several Sanskrit texts and wrote on various subjects. Among his works were a history of the Tartar kings, a biography of Sakya Pandita, a treatise on poetry called An Ornament of a Monk's Thought, and a romance of Shambhala. The last-mentioned text provides interesting glimpses of the Tibetan geographical knowledge of Central and West Asia. He was popularly known as Pandita Gyalpo, the scholar king.

== Dark omens ==
Although Ngawang Jigme Drakpa is characterized as able in temporal affairs, the rule of the Rinpungpa drew towards its end. An invasion in western Tibet was conducted in 1555, either by him or his brother. The aim was to subjugate Ngari and Latö (western Tsang) which had once stood under Rinpungpa suzerainty but were autonomous by this time. However, the local rulers Kunga Drakpa Dorje of Mangyül Gungthang and Sonam Gyalpo of Tsada formed an alliance and met the Tsang troops. The latter failed badly in the decisive battle. As a result of the war the Rinpungpa lost the dzong (fortress) of Shelkar. In 1563 there was warfare in Tsang itself; Ngawang Jigme Drakpa interfered in a conflict between Sakya and Changdakpa, and personally led his troops in the field. Meanwhile, various omens were seen. A cloud appeared in the form of the wrathful deity Rahula, causing a hailstorm that destroyed the crops. Religious sites were damaged and meteorites fell. Dried torma offerings fell on the roof of the ruler's castle. The ruler himself complains in a text from 1557 that his officers and relatives turned their backs to him, that ministers acted like petty rulers, and that his servants did not fulfill their duties. Conditions in society turned chaotic as there was no rule of the law. Eventually the despairing ruler retreated to a secret place on the top of his palace like a yogi. As he put it, fame was like an echo which did not have any real meaning in life. Life was like a dream and a dance of a mad person.

== Fall of the Rinpungpa ==
A relative of the Rinpungpa, Karma Tseten, was the governor of the Samdrubtse castle at Shigatse since 1548. In 1557, according to one source, he rose in rebellion against the Rinpungpa. Another account, an eyewitness account by the renowned Drukpa hierarch Kunkhyen Pema Karpo, states that Karma Tseten still carried out his duties by 1565. By this time there was widespread discontent with the rule of the family, and Karma Tseten supported various rebellious estates. In 1565 he started an uprising that took the Rinpungpa completely by surprise. The rebels seized Panam Lhundrup Kyungtse and the Pakmori Gold Castle. As the Rinpungpa soldiers dispersed, the place of the wangden (prince) Ngawang Jigme Drakpa was encircled by enemies. One of his sons was killed and he was taken captive. The Drukpa lama Kunkhyen Pema Karpo arranged a peaceful settlement between the parties. However, just after the Tibetan new year in 1566 a new war broke out in lower Nyangtö.

After another intervention by Kunkhyen, Ngawang Jigme Drakpa agreed to cede the entire Panam region to Tseten Dorje. These events marked the definitive end of Rinpungpa prominence in Central Tibet. According to one anecdote, the wife of Ngawang Jigme Drakpa told her husband about the defeat sustained by his troops against Karma Tseten. He then replied that it did not matter since he had finished his poem. The impoverished Ngawang Jigme Drakpa was allowed to continue as a local lord. A few abortive military campaigns were subsequently undertaken by the waning Rinpungpa, against Narthang in Tsang in 1567, and against Kyishö in Ü in 1575. The Tsang-Rong war of 1588-89 further crippled the Rinpungpa and they had to capitulate their remaining authority to the Tsangpa in 1590.

Ngawang Jigme Drakpa died in 1597, leaving two sons called Dawa Zangpo and Gewa Pal. He was succeeded as lord of Rinpung by a certain Norbu Zangpo who died in 1601. By this time the estate only had local importance. The usurper Karma Tseten, also known as Zhingshagpa, became the ancestor of the Tsangpa Dynasty that ruled parts of Tibet until 1642.

Preceded by Dondup Tseten Dorje	Ruler of Tsang; 1547–1565	Succeeded by Karma Tseten
