= Dondup Tseten Dorje =

5th Rinpunga Tibetan ruler (?-1620)

Dondup Tseten Dorje (Tibetan: དོན་གྲུབ་ཚེ་བརྟན་རྡོ་རྗེ, Wylie: don grub tshe brtan rdo rje; d. 1620) was the penultimate prince of the Rinpungpa dynasty which held power in Tsang (West Central Tibet) between 1435 and 1565. The details about his reign, and his exact years in power, are relatively obscure.

== Reign ==
Dondup Tseten Dorje was the second son of the Rinpungpa lord Ngawang Namgyal. His father, who was the ruling prince of Tsang, died at an uncertain date in the mid-sixteenth century, probably in 1544. The oldest brother, whose name was possibly Padma Karpo, had already died as a young man, and Dondup Tseten Dorje appears as ruler in the following years. The details of succession are obscure, however, since his brothers Ngawang Jigme Drakpa and Rinchen Wanggyal are known to have captured the important stronghold Samdrubtse in 1547 from unspecified enemies, and to have obtained a ruling position. Dondup Tseten Dorje was reputedly a valiant warrior. Like his predecessors he was a patron of the Karmapa sect of Buddhism. He assisted the Karmapa hierarch Mikyö Dorje (1507–54) to build the Sungrap Ling monastery. He also established a preceptor-patron relationship with the lama Kunkhyen Pema Karpo (1527–92) of the Drukpa Kagyu sect, who visited Dondup Tseten Dorje in his castle in 1549. The prince had good religious knowledge and received instruction in Vajrayanasikhara mysticism in the school of the lama Tashi Palzang. Even before the death of his father he expanded Rinpungpa territory by gaining possession of the fief Lhundrubtse in the Nam region. The dynasty tried unsuccessfully to continue the westward expansion initiated by Ngawang Namgyal. Dondup Tseten Dorje or his brother Ngawang Jigme Drakpa suffered a notable defeat in 1555 when the Rinpungpa vainly attacked the Mangyül Gungthang kingdom in western Tibet. The prince himself is not known for political activity after the mid-sixteenth century, although he lived a long life and died in 1620. His junior brother Ngawang Jigme Drakpa is referred as the ruler of the Rinpungpa in the 1560s when the power of the dynasty was decisively broken by the new Tsangpa dynasty.

== Later life ==
After the serious defeats at the hands of the Tsangpa in 1565–66, Dondup Tseten Dorje was able to maintain a position as lord of Lhunpotse in Tsang for several decades. In spite of his insignificant powers he was still formally known as miwang (ruler of men) and desi (regent) in the sources. His attachment to lama Kunkhyen Pema Karpo extended to the latter's supposed reincarnation Pagsam Wangpo (1593–1653) who visited Lhunpotse and provided public teachings. The prince became a devotee of Pagsam Wangpo and assisted him in renovating a hall and building colleges in Chamchen monastery in Chayul in the early 17th century. The lama in turn ordained Dondup Tseten and his son (or sons) at Chamchen. Dondup Tseten Dorje stood in a family relation with the victorious Tsangpa dynasty since he is referred as the "uncle" of king Karma Phuntsok Namgyal (r. 1611–1620). He died in 1620. After his demise Lhunpotse was headed by a zhabdrung (lama-official), probably his son, who was a pupil of Pagsam Wangpo and accompanied him on his journeys.

Preceded by Ngawang Namgyal	Ruler of Tsang; 1544–?	Succeeded by Ngawang Jigme Drakpa
