= Ramba Township =

Village and township in Shigatse, Tibet

Coordinates: 29°06′N 90°06′E

Ramba is a village and township in the Tibet Autonomous Region of China. It is located 107 kilometres south of Lhasa in Rinbung County, Shigatse Prefecture. There is also a lake, Ramba Co in the area.

== See also ==
- List of towns and villages in Tibet
