= Rinbung Township =

Township in Tibet, China

Coordinates: 29°17′N 89°51′E

Rinbung is a township and seat of Rinbung County in the Shigatse Prefecture of the Tibet Autonomous Region of China.

== See also ==
- List of towns and villages in Tibet
