= Jamyang Shakya Gyaltsen =

2nd Phagmodrupa Tibetan ruler (1340-1373)

Jamyang Shakya Gyaltsen (Tibetan: འཇམ་དབྱངས་ཤ་ཀྱ་རྒྱལ་མཚན, Wylie: aJam dbyangs sha kya rgyal mts'an, 1340–1373) was a ruler of Central Tibet in 1364–1373. He was a member of the Phagmodrupa dynasty which was the major Tibetan power from 1354 to 1435. His time was one of political stability in Central Tibet, and the establishment of amicable relations with the Ming dynasty of China.

== Youth and ascent to power ==
Jamyang Shakya Gyaltsen was the eldest son of Sonam Zangpo, a brother of the founder of the Phagmodrupa regime, Tai Situ Changchub Gyaltsen. His mother was Damo Nyetuma. When nine years of age he was made a monastic novice. In 1352 he was elevated to boy-abbot of the see of Tsethang. The young abbot was close to the well-known scholar Buton Rinchen Drub, who praised his wide knowledge of religious matters. According to Buton, "if in front of all fields of Yarlung from Gonpo Dongri different mandalas were to be dedicated, he could cover all these fields", meaning that he had the initiation in all mandalas, and could ensure sacral protection of the fields. When his uncle Tai Situ Changchub Gyaltsen died at the end of 1364, Jamyang Shakya Gyaltsen succeeded him as regent (desi) of Tibet, but also kept his religious position. His powers in the first hand applied to the central parts of Tibet (Ü and Tsang).

== Relations with the Yuan and the Ming ==
At the time of Jamyang Shakya Gyaltsen's accession, the Mongol Yuan dynasty was at its last throes, and had little or no opportunity to intervene in the affairs of Tibet like before. In 1365, however, the new regent received the title Gushri and the investiture of the Nêdong district, the original fief of the Phagmogrupa line, from the emperor Toghon Temür. In 1368 the latter lost the imperial throne, and the Ming dynasty took power in China. The Mingshi or dynastic annals say: "In the beginning of the fifth year Hongwu [1372] the [commander of the] garrison of Hezhou said that in the country of Pamuzhuba [Phagmodrupa] in Ü and Tsang there was a monk who was called Zhangyang Shajia Jiancang [Jamyang Shakya Gyaltsen], to whom in the Yuan's times, had been given the title of Guanding Guoshi, and to whom the barbarians had been entrusted. Now Shangzhu Jiancang [Changchub Gyaltsen, another person than the regent's predecessor], the chief of Dogan [Do Kham], fought against Guan Wuer. If that monk of Pamuzhuba had been sent to persuade him, Dogan would certainly have become a subject of the Chinese Empire. The Emperor accepted this advice, and again appointed that monk Guanding Guoshi, and sent envoys to him to give him the jade seal and coloured silk." Whether this information should be taken at face value, and implies the introduction of Ming governance, is disputed between Western and Tibetan historians on one hand, and Chinese on the other; at any rate, the Phagmodrupa governance kept its own administration and political network without direct Chinese intervention.

== End of the reign ==
The rule of Jamyang Shakya Gyaltsen was generally tranquil. According to the Debther marpo sarma he only once had to wage a war against enemies in the Tsang region, which met with complete success. Other sources, however, suggest that his grip on the Tsang region was incomplete, and that the rising principality of Gyantse halted his troops in 1364 and 1369. In 1373 the regent organized a large council in the original fief of the dynasty, Nêdong. This event marked a highlight of the domination of the Phagmodrupa. The regent died at the end of the same year. Although he had taken monastic vows, he had a son called Drakpa Rinchen. This person was not in the line of succession; his descendants became local chiefs of Gemo. Instead, the deceased regent was briefly succeeded by his younger brother Shakya Rinchen, who lost his reason after an accident. After this incident, the dignity of regent went to a nephew called Drakpa Changchub.

== See also ==
- History of Tibet
- Sino-Tibetan relations during the Ming dynasty
- Kagyu

== Further references ==
- Olaf Czaja, Medieval Rule in Tibet: The Rlangs Clan and the Political and Religious History of the Ruling House of Phag mo gru pa, Vol. I-II, Wien 2013.
- Tsepon W.D. Shakabpa, Tibet. A Political History. Yale 1967.
- Ya Hanzhang, Biographies of the Tibetan Spiritual Leaders Panchen Erdenis. Beijing 1994.

Preceded by Tai Situ Changchub Gyaltsen	Ruler of Tibet; 1364–1373	Succeeded by Drakpa Changchub
