= Ngawang Pem =

Bhutanese civil servant

Ngawang Pem is a Bhutanese civil servant. In 2012, she was appointed Dzongda (district governor) of Tsirang District, making her the first woman Dzongda in Bhutan.

She graduated from Sherubste College, Kanglung, Tashigang and in 2006 completed a master's degree in public policy at the Australian National University, Canberra, Australia.

Pem joined the Ministry of Home and Cultural Affairs in 1994. She held the position of chief human resource officer in the Ministry of Agriculture, and in 2012 she was appointed Dzongda of Tsirang. In 2018, she was appointed a Commissioner on Bhutan's Anti Corruption Commission.
