= Phagmodrupa dynasty =

Tibetian regime from 1354 to the early 1600s

Phagmodrupa dynasty ཕག་མོ་གྲུ་པ་ 帕木竹巴
- 1354–1618

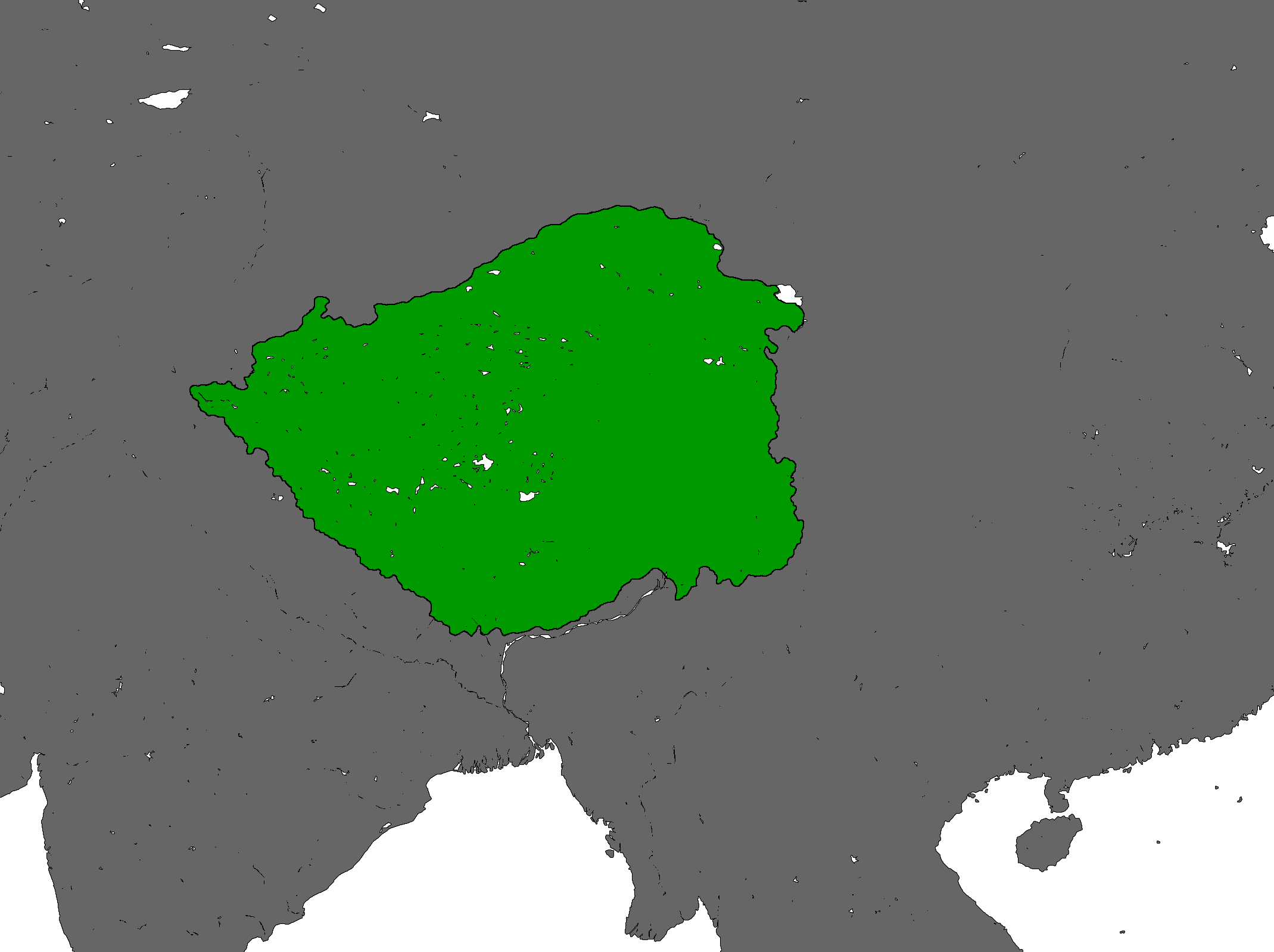
- The Phagmodrupa dynasty in 1354
- Capital: Nêdong
- Common languages: Tibetan
- Religion: Tibetan Buddhism
- Government: Buddhist theocracy
- Monarch
  - 1354-1364: Tai Situ Changchub Gyaltsen (first)
  - c.1600-1618: Mipham Sonam Wangchuk Drakpa Namgyal Palzang (last)
- History
  - Established: 1354
  - Disestablished: 1618
Preceded by	Succeeded by
Tibet under Yuan rule	Rinpungpa
- Today part of: China

The Phagmodrupa dynasty (Tibetan: ཕག་མོ་གྲུ་པ་, Wylie: phag mo gru pa) was a dynastic regime that held sway over Tibet or parts thereof from 1354 to the early 17th century. It was established by Tai Situ Changchub Gyaltsen of the Lang (Wylie: rlangs) family at the end of the Mongol-led Yuan dynasty. The dynasty had a lasting importance on the history of Tibet; it created an autonomous kingdom after Yuan rule, revitalized the national culture, and brought about a new legislation that survived until the 1950s. Nevertheless, the Phagmodrupa had a turbulent history due to internal family feuding and the strong localism among noble lineages and fiefs. Its power receded after 1435 and was reduced to Ü (East Central Tibet) in the 16th century due to the rise of the ministerial family of the Rinpungpa. It was defeated by the rival Tsangpa dynasty in 1613 and 1620, and was formally superseded by the Ganden Phodrang regime founded by the 5th Dalai Lama in 1642. In that year, Güshi Khan of the Khoshut formally transferred the old possessions of Sakya, Rinpung and Phagmodrupa to the "Great Fifth".

== History ==
=== The foundation of the Phagmodrupa ===
Founder Changchub Gyaltsen came from the monastic principality Phagmodru ("sow's ferry crossing"), which was founded as a hermitage in 1158 by the famous Kagyu scholar Phagmo Drupa Dorje Gyalpo. It was situated in the Nêdong district southeast of Lhasa. Some time after the death of the founder in 1170, some of his disciples met and organized a true monastery, called Dansa Thil (Wylie: gdan sa mthil, 1198). Phagmodru evolved into a large and wealthy estate around the monastery, which was governed by members of the Lang family. They maintained a variant of the Dagpo Kagyu school of Buddhism known as the Phagdru Kagyu. When Mongol rule was imposed on Tibet in the mid-13th century, Phagmodru became an appanage under Hülegü Khan (d. 1266), forming one of the thirteen myriarchies (divisions) of Central Tibet. Towards the end of the 13th century the myriarchy fell on hard times and lost territory. Its fortunes were revived by Changchub Gyaltsen, who became lord of the fief in 1322. He managed to defeat various local opponents at a time when the Yuan dynasty, overlord of Tibet, was on the decline. The Sakya regime, centered in Tsang (West Central Tibet) had hitherto wielded power over Tibet on behalf of the Mongols. However, Tai Situ Changchub Gyaltsen superseded Sakya in the period 1354–1358, thereby recreating an autonomous Tibetan state.

Mongol ruler Toghon Temür was beset by inner troubles, and so preferred to confirm the acquisitions of Changchub Gyaltsen, and conferred the titles darakache and tai situ (grand tutor) on him. The Ming dynasty made no attempt to reinstate the tight grip on Tibet once exercised by the Mongols. In 1372 the Hongwu Emperor conferred the title Guanding Guoshi on Changchub Gyaltsen's successor Jamyang Shakya Gyaltsen (r. 1364–1373) together with a jade seal.

=== Administrative renewal ===
The new regime governed from their palace in Nêdong in the Yarlung Valley. Changchub Gyaltsen did not take royal titles but preferred the title desi (sde srid) that means regent, namely for the ancient kings of Tibet (600–842) whose glory he wished to revive. The new regent reorganized the old Mongol-Sakya administration by sharing up the territory in divisions (de or dzongchen), under which were dzong (rdzong), districts. These were headed by dzongpons who governed from fortified cities (also called dzong) and combined civil and military functions; these were chosen from among Changchub Gyaltsen's close followers and initially were not hereditary. He abolished Mongol laws and customs in favour of traditional Tibetan ones, which were much less harsh. Three centuries later his laws were revised by the Fifth Dalai Lama and Sangye Gyatso, and then remained in effect until the invasion of Tibet by Maoist China. The dynasty in the first place wielded power over Central Tibet (Ü and Tsang).

After 1373 the rulers periodically dispatched formal tributes to the emperors of the Ming dynasty in China, and received from them the title Chanhuawang (Chinese: 闡化王, prince who expounds Buddhism) in 1406. The Ming court formally established a number of prefectures (都司) and counties (寨) in Central Tibet. A Chinese I military commissioner was appointed in Hezhou close to the border in 1374. The emperor bestowed on him general governing authority over Do-Kham (Eastern Tibet) and Ü-Tsang (Central Tibet). However, there is no trace of this office in the Tibetan chronicles or documents. Tibetan sources show that the titles and seals sent by the Chinese authorities were valued by the Phagmodrupa as adding to their prestige, but that no ordinances, taxes or laws were imposed by the Ming. The emperor clearly preferred to issue formal appointments of Tibetans as rulers rather than to try to send officials or military commanders. Only essential matters, for instance the ownership of Sakya Monastery, were to be judged by the emperor. Overall, as argued by Martin Slobodník, "the Phag-mo-gru did not represent an important ally or a dangerous enemy of the Ming Dynasty in its Inner Asian policy. The amount of information on these relations available in Chinese and Tibetan sources reflects the fact that at any time it did not represent a priority either for the Chinese or the Tibetan side. In relations with China Tibet was only one of numerous peripheral regions".

=== Period of political stability ===
The first rulers were lamas who did not marry, and the succession up to 1481 went via collateral kinsmen. The dynasty was divided into three branches or rather functionaries: the ruling desi, the spiritual masters (chen-nga) of the Dansa Thil and Tsethang monasteries, and the preserver of the family (dunggyu dsinpa) who sired children to continue the Lang lineage. While the first four rulers declined to take royal titles, being content with the dignity of desi, the fifth ruler Drakpa Gyaltsen appropriated the royal titles gongma (the high one, superior) and chogyal. From 1354 to 1435 the rulers managed to uphold a balance between the various fiefs. In particular the 47-years reign of Drakpa Gyaltsen (1385–1432) was remembered as generally peaceful and prosperous. The early Phagmodrupa era is famous for being culturally productive, and has even been termed a "golden age". There was an intense interest in reviving the glories of the ancient Tibetan kingdom, and many supposedly ancient texts were "rediscovered" by learned clerics. The monasteries gained increasing influence on the life of the Tibetans. This period included the work of the Buddhist reformer Je Tsongkhapa, founder of the Gelug sect, and that of his younger kinsman Gedun Drub, posthumously counted as the first Dalai Lama. The rulers in the first century of the dynasty were as follows:

1. Tai Situ Changchub Gyaltsen (Wylie: ta'i si tu byang chub rgyal mtshan) (1302–1364, r. 1354–1364)
2. Desi Shakya Gyaltsen (Wylie: sde srid sh'akya rgyal mtshan, ZWPY: Sagya Gyaincain) (1340–1373, r. 1364–1373) nephew
3. Desi Drakpa Changchub (Wylie: sde srid grags pa byang chub) (1356–1386, r. 1373–1381) nephew
4. Desi Sonam Drakpa (Wylie: sde srid bsod nams grags pa) (1359–1408, r. 1381–1385) brother
5. Gongma Drakpa Gyaltsen (Wylie: gong ma grags pa rgyal mtshan) (1374–1432, r. 1385–1432) cousin
6. Gongma Drakpa Jungne (Wylie: gong ma grags pa 'byung gnas) (1414–1445, r. 1432–1445) nephew

=== Renewed political fragmentation ===
At length the Phagmodrupa were crippled by internal dissent in the Lang family. A brief civil war in 1434 weakened their position. Powerful feudatories took the opportunity to increase their power, in particular the Rinpungpa family who came to dominate Tsang. In 1481 one of their line, Donyo Dorje, managed to have the king Kunga Lekpa (r. 1448–1481) deposed. The Rinpungpa tended to associate with the Karmapa sect of Buddhism while the Phagmodrupa often (but not exclusively) favoured the rival Gelug sect. In the political landscape at this period it was important for rulers to find alliances with powerful monasteries and sects. Kunga Lekpa's grandnephew Ngawang Tashi Drakpa (r. 1499–1554, 1556/57–1564) managed to push back the Rinpungpa from the Lhasa area in 1517–18. He was the last effective king of the dynasty, keeping good relations with the Second and Third Dalai Lamas, but his influence was mainly restricted to Ü. As he grew old, new infighting beset the family, and his death in 1564 was followed by a long interregnum. Eventually his grandson Ngawang Drakpa Gyaltsen was placed on the increasingly hollow throne in 1576. Though largely powerless, he maintained some importance as a focal point around whom the various noble and clerical factions of East Central Tibet balanced. At the same time a new powerful dynasty arose in Tsang. This was the Tsangpa (1565–1642) who overthrew the Rinpungpa and increased their territory in various parts of Tibet. Like the Rinpungpa they allied with the Karmapa sect.

The history of the Phagmodrupa after the death of Ngawang Drakpa Gyaltsen in 1603/04 is very obscure since they were by now entirely eclipsed by other political factions. They were defeated by the Tsangpa in 1613 and again in 1620, and the final incumbent was expelled from Lhasa in 1635. After his victory over the Tsangpa in 1642, the Fifth Dalai Lama entertained friendly relations with the last titular lord of the line. Some years after the latter's death in 1671, Nêdong was however given to an outsider and the Lang family lapsed into obscurity. In spite of its inglorious later history, the dynasty has a good reputation in traditional historiography. A history translated by Sarat Chandra Das in 1905 says: "During the reign of the Phag[mo]du dynasty all Tibet enjoyed peace and prosperity. People became rich in money and cattle. The country enjoyed immunity from famine and murrain, and was not harassed by foreign invasion. Although some petty fights and quarrels with some of the disaffected and rapacious ministers now and then disturbed the peace of the country, yet on the whole, the dynasty was beneficial to Tibet".

The last eight rulers were:

1. Gongma Kunga Lekpa (Wylie: gong ma kun dga' legs pa) (1433–1483, r. 1448–1481) brother
2. Gongma Ngagi Wangpo (Wylie: gong ma ngag gi dbang po) (1439–1491, r. 1481–1491) nephew
3. Tsokye Dorje (Wylie: mTs'o skyes rdo rje) (1450–1510, r. 1491–1499) regent from the Rinpungpa line
4. Gongma Ngawang Tashi Drakpa (Wylie: gong ma ngag dbang bkra shis grags pa) (1488–1564, r. 1499–1554, 1556/57–1564) son of Gongma Ngagi Wangpo
5. Gongma Drowai Gonpo (Wylie: gong ma gro ba'i mgon po) (1508–1548, r. 1524–1548) son
6. Gongma Ngawang Drakpa (Wylie: gong ma ngag dbang grags pa) (d. 1603/04, r. 1554–1556/57, 1576–1603/04) son
7. Mipham Wanggyur Gyalpo (Wylie: mi pham dbang sgyur rgyal po) (c. 1589–1613, r. 1604–1613) grandnephew (?)
8. Mipham Sonam Wangchuk Drakpa Namgyal Palzang (Wylie: mi pham bsod nams dbang phyug grags pa rnam rgyal pal bzang) (d. 1671, r. after 1613) grandson of Ngawang Drakpa Gyaltsen

== See also ==
- History of Tibet
- List of rulers of Tibet
- Ming–Tibet relations
- Kagyu
