= Rinbung County =

Rinbung County 仁布县 • རིན་སྤུངས་རྫོང་།
- County
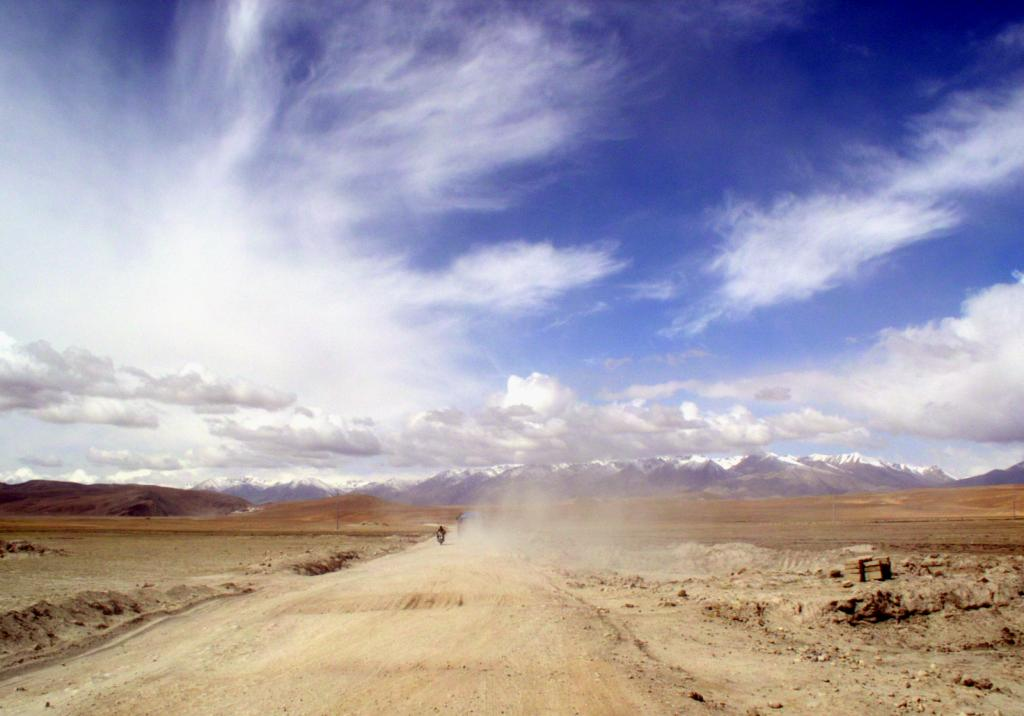
- On the road from Lhasa to Gyantse.

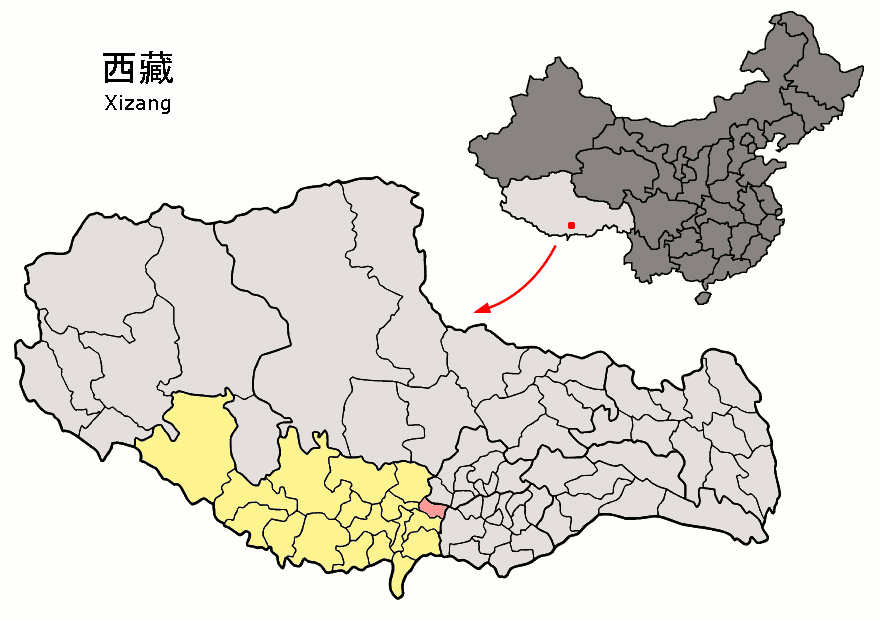
- Location of Rinbung County (red) within Shigatse City (yellow) and the Tibet AR

- Location of the seat in the Tibet AR Rinbung (China)
- Coordinates (Rinbung government): 29°13′52″N 89°50′31″E
- Country: China
- Autonomous region: Tibet
- Prefecture-level city: Xigazê
- County seat: Dê'gyiling

Area
  - Total: 2,124.1 km^{2} (820.1 sq mi)

Population (2020)
  - Total: 33,530
  - Density: 15.79/km^{2} (40.88/sq mi)
- Time zone: UTC+8 (China Standard)
- Website: www.renbu.gov.cn

Rinbung County

Chinese name
- Simplified Chinese: 仁布县
- Traditional Chinese: 仁布縣
Transcriptions
Standard Mandarin
- Hanyu Pinyin: Rénbù Xiàn

Tibetan name
- Tibetan: རིན་སྤུངས་རྫོང་།
Transcriptions
- Wylie: rin spungs rdzong
- Tibetan Pinyin: Rinbung Zong

Rinbung County (Tibetan: རིན་སྤུངས་རྫོང་།; Chinese: 仁布县) is a county at the northeastern boundary of the prefecture-level city of Xigazê in the Tibet Autonomous Region, China.

== Administration divisions ==
Rinbung County is divided into 1 town and 8 townships.

Name	Chinese	Hanyu Pinyin	Tibetan	Wylie
Town
Dê'gyiling Town	德吉林镇	Déjílín zhèn	བདེ་སྐྱིད་གླིང་གྲོང་རྡལ།	bde skyid gling grong rdal
Townships
Kangxung Township	康雄乡	Kāngxióng xiāng	ཁང་གཞུང་ཤང་།	khang gzhung shang
Pusum Township	普松乡	Pǔsōng xiāng	ཕུ་གསུམ་ཤང་།	phu gsum shang
Bartang Township	帕当乡	Pàdāng xiāng	བར་ཐང་ཤང་།	bar thang shang
Ramba Township	然巴乡	Ránbā xiāng	རམ་པ་ཤང་།	ram pa shang
Chagba Township	茶巴乡	Chábā xiāng	བྲག་པ་ཤང་།	brag pa shang
Qewa Township	切洼乡	Qiēwā xiāng	བྱེ་བ་ཤང་།	brye ba shang
Moin Township	姆乡	Mǔ xiāng	སྨོན་ཤང་།	smon shang
Rinbung Township	仁布乡	Rénbù xiāng	རིན་སྤུངས་ཤང་།	rin spungs shang
