= Monlam Prayer Festival =

Tibetan Buddhist religious festival

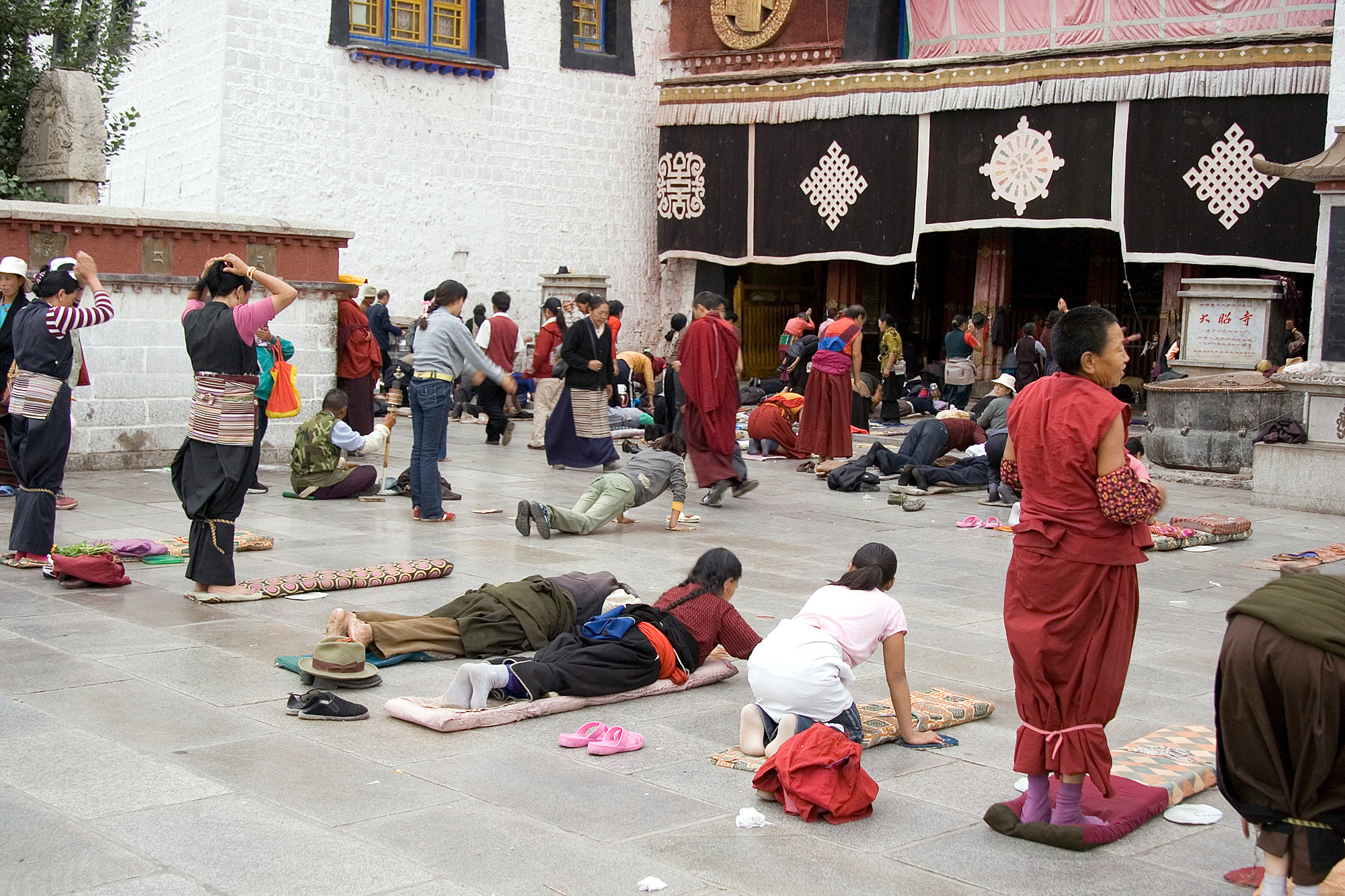
- Pilgrims at Jokhang, Lhasa during Monlam

Chinese name
- Simplified Chinese: 默朗木祈愿大法会
- Traditional Chinese: 孟蘭祈願大法會
Transcriptions
Standard Mandarin
- Hanyu Pinyin: Mòlǎng Mù Qíyuàn Dàfǎhuì

Alternative Chinese name
- Simplified Chinese: 传召法会
- Traditional Chinese: 傳召法會
Transcriptions
Standard Mandarin
- Hanyu Pinyin: Chuánzhào Fǎhuì

Tibetan name
- Tibetan: སྨོན་ལམ་
Transcriptions
- Wylie: Smon-lam

Monlam, also known as Monlam Chenmo or The Great Prayer Festival, falls on the 4th to 11th day of the 1st Tibetan month in Tibetan Buddhism.

== History ==
The event of Monlam in Tibet was established in 1409 by Je Tsongkhapa in Lhasa, the founder of the Geluk tradition. As the greatest religious festival in Tibet, thousands of monks (of the three main monasteries of Drepung, Sera and Ganden) gathered to chant prayers and perform religious rituals at the Jokhang Temple in Lhasa. The inaugural celebration attracted many devotees, and it has been performed for about 600 years.

In 1517, Gedun Gyatso became the abbot of Drepung monastery and in the following year, he revived the Monlam Chenmo, the Great Prayer Festival and presided over the events with monks from Sera, Drepung and Ganden, the three great monastic universities of the Gelugpa Sect.

"The main purpose of the Great Prayer Festival is to pray for the long life of all the holy Gurus of all traditions, for the survival and spreading of the Dharma in the minds of all sentient beings, and for world peace. The communal prayers, offered with strong faith and devotion, help to overcome obstacles to peace and generate conducive conditions for everyone to live in harmony."

The celebration of Monlam in the Lhasa Jokhang was forbidden during the Cultural Revolution (1966–1976), although it had not been practiced there since 1959, and would not be hosted in Lhasa again until 1986. During the late 1980s, Tibetan organizers used Monlam and post-Monlam ceremonies for political demonstrations. During Monlam, monks stood on platforms to pray for the long life of the 14th Dalai Lama, boys threw rocks at observing police, and symbols advocating Tibetan independence were displayed. When these demonstrations failed to produce results, monks even suggested boycotting Monlam to show their displeasure with the government. Since security forces were prohibited from breaking up the demonstrations as "they were ostensibly [purely] religious", the city government suspended the Monlam in 1990.

Monlam festivals are upheld by Tibetan Buddhist monasteries established in exile in India.

In 2024, websites related to the Monlam festivals were attacked by the Chinese government advanced persistent threat group "Evasive Panda" for cyberespionage purposes.

== Practices ==
Examinations for the highest 'Lharampa Geshe' degree (a degree in Buddhist philosophy in the Geluk tradition) were held during the week-long festival. Monks would perform traditional Tibetan Buddhist dances (cham) and make huge ritual offering cakes (tormas) that were adorned with very elaborate butter sculptures. On the fifteenth day, the highlight of Monlam Chenmo in Lhasa would be the "Butter Lamp Festival" (Chunga Choepa), during which the Dalai Lama would come to the Jokhang Temple and perform the great Buddhist service. Barkhor Square in front of the Jokhang would be turned into a grand exhibition site for the huge tormas. At the end of the festival, these tormas would be burned in a large bonfire.

Traditionally, from New Year's Day until the end of Monlam, lay Tibetans would make merry. Many pilgrims from all over Tibet joined the prayers and teachings and made donations to the monks and nuns.

Many other monasteries would hold special prayer sessions and perform religious rituals: for example, some monasteries would unfold huge religious scroll-paintings (thangkas) for all to see.

=== Aspiration Prayers ===
In the Kagyu Monlam Chenmo, the main practice by the assembled monks and lay people is the Wishing Prayer of Samantabhadra, part of the preserved words of the Buddha according to the Tibetan tradition. This prayer has at its core the Enlightened Attitude (Bodhisattva Vow) of Mahayana Buddhism, that the practitioner may attain enlightenment for the benefit of all beings.

== See also ==
- 2nd Dalai Lama
- Shuilu Fahui, the Chinese Buddhist equivalent
