= Nêdong (village) =

Coordinates: 29°14′N 91°48′E

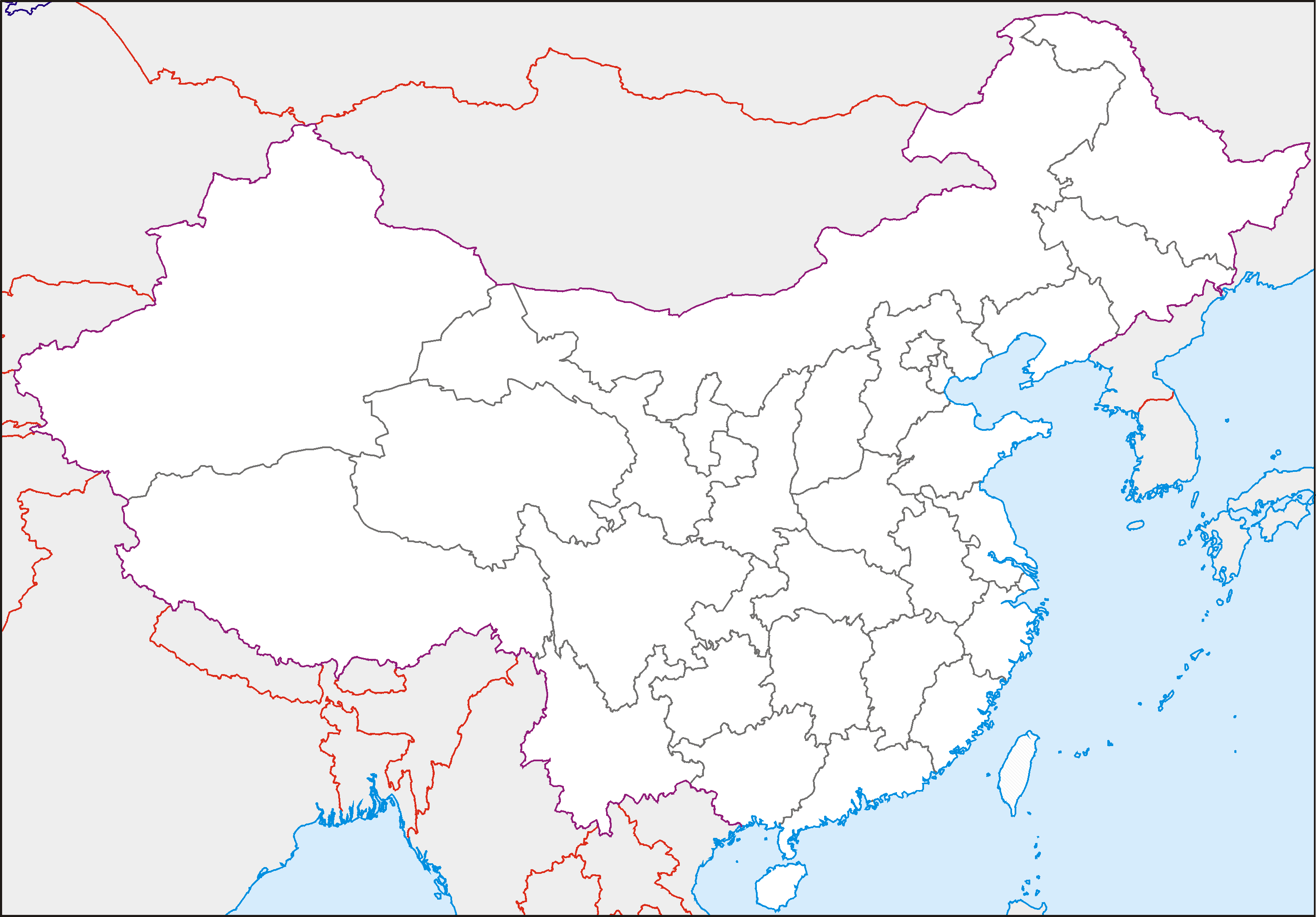
Nêdong in China's

Nêdong or Nêtong is a village in Nêdong County, in the Shannan Prefecture of Tibet.

Nedong was the seat of the Phagmodrupa dynasty, which was the dominating regime in Tibet from 1354 to 1435 and maintained a degree of authority until the early 17th century.

== See also ==
- List of towns and villages in Tibet
