= Ü (region) =

Historical region of Tibet

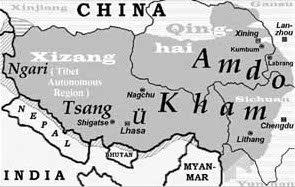
Map of Tibet Ü-Tsang Amdo and Kham

Ü (Tibetan: དབུས་, Wylie: dbus, ZWPY: Wü, Lhasa dialect: [wyː˨˧˩]) is a geographic division and a historical region in Tibet. Together with Tsang (གཙང་, gtsang), it forms Central Tibet Ü-Tsang (དབུས་གཙང་, dbus gtsang), which is one of the three Tibetan regions or cholka (cholka-sum). The other two cholka are Kham (ཁམས་, khams) (Dotod) and Amdo (ཨ༌མདོ; a mdo) (Domed). According to a Tibetan saying, "the best religion comes from Ü-Tsang, the best men from Kham, and the best horses from Amdo".

== Constituent districts ==
Taken together, Ü and Tsang are considered to be the center of Tibetan civilization, from historical, cultural, political and economic perspectives. They are centered on the valley of the Yarlung Tsangpo River, which flows eastward at about 3,600 metres (11,800 ft) above sea level. Of this territory, Ü constitutes the eastern portion, up to Sokla Kyao in the east where it borders to Kham. It includes the Lhasa River valley system, where Lhasa is situated, and the Yarlung and Chonggye valleys to the south of the Tsangpo.

During the period of Mongol rule at the end of the 13th century, Ü and Tsang were divided in thirteen myriarchies (trikor). The exact list of myriarchies varies somewhat from source to source. According to The Song of the Spring Queen, the chronicle of the 5th Dalai Lama, those of Ü were Gyama, Drikung, Tsalpa, Thangpochewa, Phagmodru, and Yazang. Some lists have Taglung instead of Thangpochewa.

== Historical status ==
The traditional centers of power in Tibet, such as the Yarlung Valley, Lhasa and Nêdong County, are located in Ü. In the 15th century, the Gelug lineage gained great influence in Ü, while Tsang to the west tended to adhere to the rival Karma Kagyu school. The Gelug-Karma rivalry overlapped with the political rivalry between the leaders of Ü and Tsang. This turbulent era remained until 1642, when the Dalai Lama and his allies inaugurated the theocratic rule of Tibet.

== See also ==
- Geography of Tibet
- Ü-Tsang
