= Ü-Tsang =

Traditional region of Tibet

Coordinates: 30°51′21″N 92°13′38″E

Chinese name
- Traditional Chinese: 烏思藏
- Simplified Chinese: 乌思藏
Transcriptions
Standard Mandarin
- Hanyu Pinyin: Wūsīzàng
- Bopomofo: ㄨ ㄙ ㄗㄤˋ
- Wade–Giles: Wu¹-Ssŭ¹-Tsang²
other Mandarin
- Sichuanese Pinyin: u¹ si¹ zang²
Wu
- Romanization: u⁵² sy³⁴ tsaon²³
Hakka
- Pha̍k-fa-sṳ: û-sṳ̂-chông
Yue: Cantonese
- Jyutping: wu¹ si¹ zong⁶
Southern Min
- Hokkien POJ: O͘-su-chōng
- Tâi-lô: O͘-su-tsàng

Alternative Chinese name
- Traditional Chinese: 衛藏
- Simplified Chinese: 卫藏
Transcriptions
Standard Mandarin
- Hanyu Pinyin: Wèizàng
- Bopomofo: ㄨㄟˋ ㄗㄤˋ
- Wade–Giles: Wei⁴-Tsang²
other Mandarin
- Sichuanese Pinyin: uei⁴ zang²
Wu
- Romanization: ue²³ tsaon²³
Hakka
- Pha̍k-fa-sṳ: vi-chông
Yue: Cantonese
- Jyutping: wai⁶ zong⁶
Southern Min
- Hokkien POJ: Ūi-chōng
- Tâi-lô: Uī-tsàng

Tibetan name
- Tibetan: དབུས་གཙང་
Transcriptions
- Wylie: dbus gtsang
- Tibetan Pinyin: Wü-Zang
- Lhasa IPA: y˥tsaŋ˥

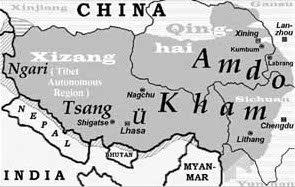
Map showing the locations of Ü-Tsang, Ngari, Kham, and Amdo

Ü-Tsang (Tibetan: དབུས་གཙང་, Wylie: dbus gtsang) is one of the three Tibetan regions, the others being Amdo to the northeast and Kham to the east. Geographically Ü-Tsang covers the Yarlung Tsangpo drainage basin, the western districts surrounding and extending past Mount Kailash, and much of the Changtang plateau to the north. The Himalayas define Ü-Tsang's southern border.

Ü-Tsang is the cultural heartland of the Tibetan people. It was formed by the merging of two earlier power centers of Ü (Wylie: dbus), controlled by the Gelug lineage of Tibetan Buddhism under the early Dalai Lamas, and Tsang (Wylie: gtsang), which extended from Gyantse to the west and was controlled by the rival Sakya lineage. Military victories by the Khoshut Güshi Khan who had backed the 5th Dalai Lama consolidated power over the combined region. The region of Ngari in the northwest was incorporated into Ü-Tsang after the Tibet–Ladakh–Mughal War.

== History ==
The Yarlung dynasty had governed the Yarlung and Chongye valleys in Ü from around 127 BCE, expanding across much of Greater Tibet during the Tibetan Empire era until the 9th century. During the Era of Fragmentation, Tibet was invaded by the Mongols, and the rule by the Yuan dynasty lasted until the mid-14th century, when the Phagmodrupa dynasty was established. In later centuries, the Rinpungpa dynasty and the Tsangpa dynasty emerged in Tsang. After the Khoshut Güshi Khan and the followers of the 5th Dalai Lama triumphed over the Tsang king Karma Tenkyong and the followers of the Karmapa, Güshi Khan bestowed spiritual and secular leadership of Tibet on the Dalai Lama, who proceeded to establish the Ganden Phodrang government in 1642 and build the Potala Palace in Lhasa. Direct and indirect rule by the Qing dynasty began in 1720 under the Kangxi Emperor and continued until the 1911 Revolution. In the 1950's the retinue of the Panchen Lama was accused of using Tsang and Ü to "sow discord". The present day Tibet Autonomous Region corresponds approximately to Ü-Tsang and the western part of Kham. The Lhasa dialect has become a lingua franca in Ü-Tsang, and the Tibetan Exile koiné language is based largely on it.

== See also ==
- List of traditional regions of Tibet
