= Drakpa Odzer =

5th Sakya Tibetan ruler (1246-1303)

Drakpa Odzer (Wylie: Grags pa 'od zer) was a Tibetan Imperial Preceptor (Dishi) at the court of the Mongol-led Yuan dynasty of China. He lived from 1246-1303 and hailed from Sakya which was the foremost monastic regime in Tibet in this period. He held the post from 1291 to his demise in 1303.

== Political background ==
Since the mid-13th century the abbots of the Sakya Monastery had been the main middlemen between Tibet and the Mongol conquerors. In 1270 one of their line, Phagpa was appointed Imperial Preceptor (Dishi). The Dishi resided near the emperor and had a major influence in the Bureau of Buddhist and Tibetan Affairs (Xuanzheng Yuan). Up to 1286 the dignity was filled by members of the Khon family who were also usually hereditary abbots of Sakya. However, due to the lack of fully ordained members of the lineage after that date, persons from other clerical elite families of Sakya origins were appointed.

== As imperial preceptor ==
One such family were the Khangsarpa. One of their line, Sumpa Drakpa Gyaltsen, begot two sons called Drakpa Odzer and Sanggye Pal. Drakpa Odzer became the general administrator in charge of Phagpa's property. Later on he accompanied Phagpa's nephew Dharmapala Raksita when he moved to Beijing to take up the Dishi dignity in 1282. When the next Dishi Yeshe Rinchen vacated his position in 1291, Drakpa Odzer was appointed his successor. As such he was confronted with the issue of the succession to the abbot-ship of Sakya, which was kept strictly apart from the Dishi position. At this time a man of the Sharpa family, Jamyang Rinchen Gyaltsen, took care of the Sakya see. The administrator (dpon-chen or ponchen) in Central Tibet, Aglen, took the initiative for summoning a council in Sakya where the leading clerics agreed to send a petition to Drakpa Odzer. There they requested that the only surviving member of the Khon family, Zangpo Pal, would be allowed to take up the position of abbot-ruler. Drakpa Odzer consented, possibly out of political necessity, and forwarded the petition to the emperor Temür who approved it. Zangpo Pal returned to Sakya in 1298, although he was not fully installed until 1306. Drakpa Odzer died at the imperial court in 1303. He was succeeded by the ex-abbot Jamyang Rinchen Gyaltsen. Later on, in 1305, his younger brother Sanggye Pal became Dishi.

== See also ==
- Tibet under Yuan rule
- History of Tibet
- Mongol Empire
- Sakya Trizin

Preceded by Yeshe Rinchen	Tibetan Imperial Preceptor; 1291–1303	Succeeded by Jamyang Rinchen Gyaltsen
