= Jamyang Donyo Gyaltsen =

Sakya Tibetan ruler (1310-1344)

Jamyang Donyo Gyaltsen, in orthographic spelling, Jam dbyangs don yod rgyal mts'an, who lived from 1310-1344, was a ruler of Sakya which had a precedence position in Tibet under the Yuan dynasty. He reigned from 1341 until his death in 1344.

== Background ==
The hegemony of the Sakya Monastery over Tibet, established by Sakya Pandita and Phagpa in the 13th century, relied on a close working relation with the Mongol regime of the Yuan dynasty (1271-1368). Members of the Khon family usually held the functions of dansa chenpo or abbot-rulers, and Dishi or Imperial Preceptors. However, after the death of the old abbot-ruler Zangpo Pal in 1323, his numerous sons were divided up into four branches, namely Zhitog, Lhakhang, Rinchengang, and Ducho.

== Factional strife ==
Internal trouble soon beset the Sakya complex, since the senior ruler Khatsun Namkha Lekpa Gyaltsen was more interested in religious than worldly business. In 1341 a clash occurred between the Zhitog and Rinchengang branches. Khatsun Namkha Lekpa Gyaltsen, who belonged to the Zhitog branch, was forced to step down as abbot-ruler. In his stead, Jamyang Donyo Gyaltsen of the Rinchengang branch was elevated to the ruling position. He was the son of Zangpo Pal and his consort Machig Shonnu Bum and held the official title tawen gushri (taiyuan guoshi). During his tenure the administration of Tibet was handled by the dpon-chen (ponchen) Sonam Pal (1337-1344). Not much is known about the short reign of Jamyang Donyo Gyaltsen, and he died after three years, in 1344. His successor was his brother Lama Dampa Sonam Gyaltsen, a famous scholar.

== See also ==
- Tibet under Yuan rule
- History of Tibet
- Mongol Empire
- Sakya Trizin

Preceded by Khatsun Namkha Lekpa Gyaltsen	Sakya lama of Tibet (Yuan overlordship); 1341–1344	Succeeded by Lama Dampa Sonam Gyaltsen
