= Khön clan of Sakya =

Khön clan of Sakya (Tibetan: འཁོན) is a Tibetan clan and nobility originally based in Sa'gya. The clan traces its history to the time of Bod Chen Po. The Sakya Trizin of Sakya school was exclusively chosen from members of this clan. The current head of Khön clan is Gyana Vajra Rinpoche.

Since the reign of Tsenpo Trisong Detsen, Khön clansmen had actively participated in the political and religious affairs of the Tibetan empire. The founder of Sakya school Khön Könchok Gyalpo was a prominent member of this clan and the one who settled the clan in Sa'gya. Khöns had ruled the region of Sa'gya for centuries. Clansmen of Khön were appointed imperial preceptors of Yuan dynasty. Yuan emperors entrusted Tibet's power to this clan. During Yuan's rule, Khön clan was the de facto ruling house of Tibet. The top administrative official of Yuan's Tibet---Benchin(本欽) were either from Khön clan or closely related to it. In addition, the "Imperial preceptor" was the head of the Bureau of Buddhist and Tibetan Affairs. Out of political interests, many marriages were arranged between the Khön clan and Borjigin. Three members of Khön clan were given the title "Prince Bailan"(白蘭王).

== Prominent members ==
- Khön Könchok Gyalpo
- Drogön Chögyal Phagpa
- Rinchen Gyaltsen
- Dharmapala Raksita
- Kunga Lotro Gyaltsen
- Lachen Sönam Lodrö
- Sakya Trizin Ngawang Kunga
