= Kunga Lekpa Jungne Gyaltsen =

9th Sakya Tibetan ruler (1308-1330)

Kunga Lekpa Jungne Gyaltsen (Wylie: Kun dga legs pa'i 'byung gnas rgyal mts'an) was a Tibetan Imperial Preceptor (Dishi) at the court of the Mongol-led Yuan dynasty. He lived from 1308-1330 and belonged to the abbot family Khon of Sakya which had a precedence position in Tibet in this era. He held the title from 1327 to his demise in 1330.

== Family background ==
Kunga Lekpa Jungne Gyaltsen was one of the 13 sons of the abbot-ruler of Sakya, Zangpo Pal (d. 1323). His mother was Machig Yondagmo. When his elder brother Kunga Lotro Gyaltsen held the dignity of Dishi, he decreed a division of Zangpo Pal's many sons into four groups, each of which resided in a particular palace (Zhitog, Lhakhang, Rinchengang, and Ducho). Kunga Lekpa Jungne Gyaltsen belonged to the Lhakhang branch. When the Dishi died in the imperial capital in March 1327, he was summoned by the emperor Yesün Temür to take up the dignity and was formally installed on 17 May 1327. He only arrived to Beijing in the next year, the route from Central Tibet being long and difficult.

== Contest for the Imperial Preceptor title ==
During the short tenure of Kunga Lekpa Jungne Gyaltsen a mysterious incident took place. According to the Yuan shi (History of the Yuan dynasty) a certain Nianzhenqilasi (Rinchen Drak) was elevated to the Imperial Preceptor (Dishi) dignity on 22 December 1329, when Kunga Lekpa Jungne Gyaltsen was still alive. The closer circumstances are missing in the sources, and it is obvious that Rinchen Drak did not belong to the Khon family. It is possible that he is identical with the Guoshi (State Preceptor) Rinchen Drak who is known to have been literary active in 1325. He might have been temporarily elevated by a faction at the imperial court which strove to exclude the Khon family of Sakya from the office. There was a rapid shift of emperors in 1328–29 which might be the backdrop for this brief alteration. According to the most reliable sources Kunga Lekpa Jungne Gyaltsen died in 1330 after a term of three years, suggesting that he managed to retain or regain his office in the end. In one version he died as late as in 1339. He was succeeded by his younger brother Kunga Gyaltsen. As common in the Khon family he married and sired children before his full ordination as monk. Of his five children, Sonam Lotro (1332–1362) briefly served as imperial preceptor in 1361–1362, when the Yuan dynasty was already in its death throes. Another son, Drakpa Gyaltsen (1336–1376) was formally viceroy of Tibet in 1360–76, at a time when the Sakya regime had already been replaced by the Phagmodrupa dynasty.

== See also ==
- Tibet under Yuan rule
- History of Tibet
- Mongol Empire
- Sakya Trizin

Preceded by Kunga Lotro Gyaltsen	Tibetan Imperial Preceptor; 1327–1330	Succeeded by Kunga Gyaltsen
