= Chumik Monastery =

Tibetan monastery

Chumik Monastery (Tibetan: chu mig dgon; Chinese: Qumi si 曲米寺) or Chumik Ringmo (chu mig ring mo; Chinese: Qumi Renmo si 曲弥仁摩寺) was an old Kadam and became later a Sakya monastery in the west of Shigatse in Tsang (gtsang).

== History ==
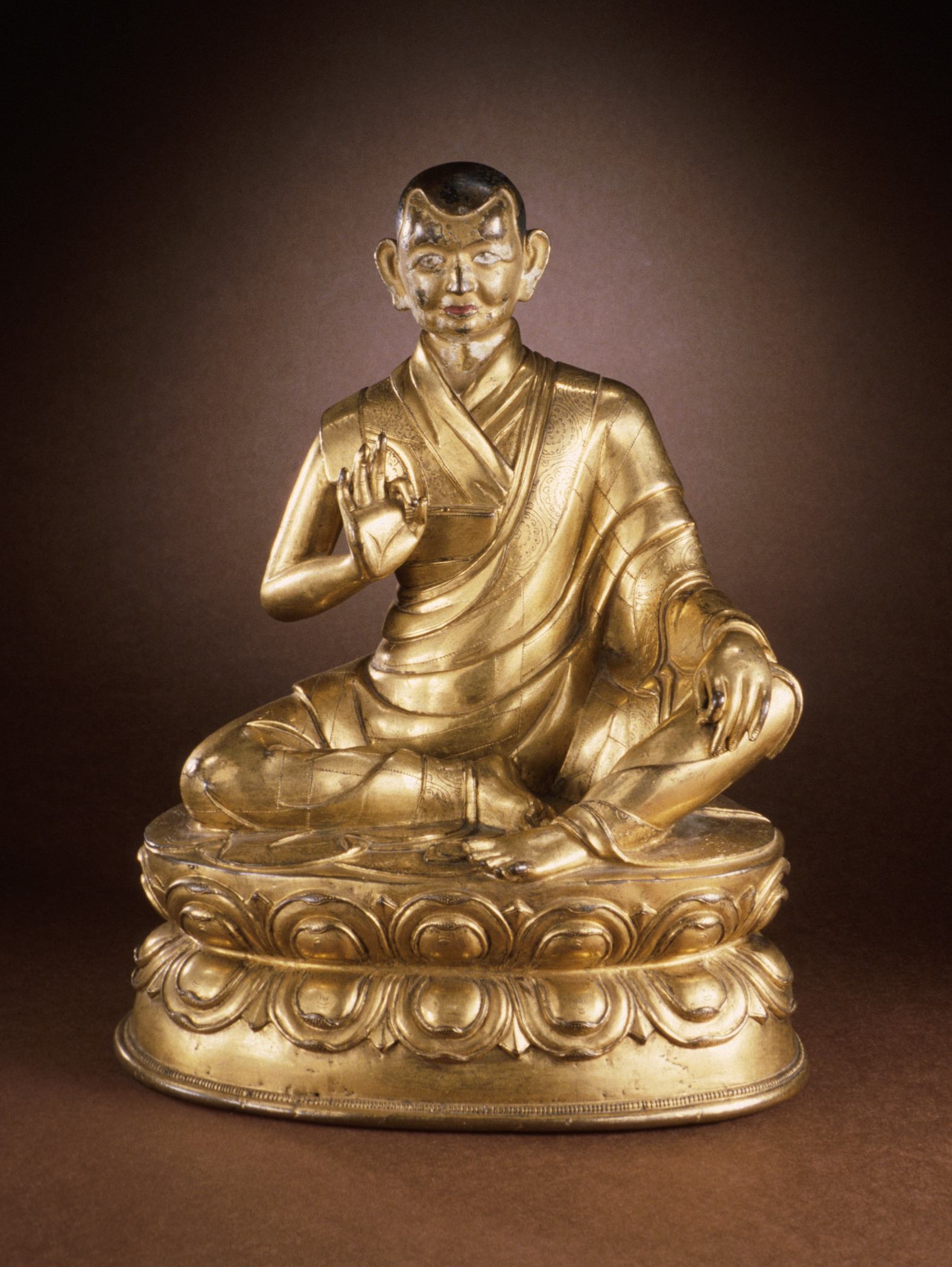
Lama Lodrö Wangchuk (blo gros dbang phyug; 1402–1481), sculpture, Chumik Monastery, 15th-16th century

The monastery was founded in the eleventh century by students of Loton Dorje Wangchuk (lo ston rdo rje dbang phyug). It was the seat of the translator Jangchub Tsemo (byang chub rtse mo). In 1277 Phagpa held a Buddhist council at the Chumik Monastery, the Great Prayer Meeting (chu mig chos 'khor), "ostensibly for religious discussions, but probably to persuade the various traditions' leaders to accept Mongol-Sakya rule" (Dominique Townsend).

Jamyang Khyentse Wangpo (1820–1892) says about the monastery:

Near Nartang is Tsang Chumik Ringmo. Formerly one of the great Kadampa monasteries, where Pagpa Rinpoche held a religious council, it is now an ordinary village. One can still visit a temple there with some sacred objects. A half day's walk from Nartang is Ngor Ewam Chöden.

The site is central to the history and practices of the Sakya tradition.

== See also ==
- Chumig (khri skor) (in German)
