= Sanggye Pal =

7th Sakya Tibetan ruler (1267–1314)

Sanggye Pal (Wylie: Sangs rgyas dpal) was a Tibetan Imperial Preceptor (Dishi) at the court of the Mongol-led Yuan dynasty of China. He lived from 1267–1314 and hailed from Sakya which was the foremost monastic regime in Tibet in this period. He held the title from 1305 to his demise in 1314.

Sanggye Pal belonged to the Khangsarpa family, being the son of Sumpa Drakpa Gyaltsen. He was the younger brother of Drakpa Odzer who previously held the Dishi title. According to the Yuan shi (History of the Yuan Dynasty), the old Dishi Jamyang Rinchen Gyaltsen (d. 1305) was followed first by a Duoerjibale (Dorje Pal) in 1305–13, and then Sangjiayizhashi (Sanggye Tashi) in 1313–14. However, a document sent to the Tibetan myriarchy Zhalu in 1307 is issued by Sanggye Pal. It is therefore probable that Sanggye Pal took over the Dishi dignity in 1305 and kept it until 1314, and that he was also known as Dorje Pal. For the rest, not much is known of his activities. Tibet in this period was relatively stable under the administration of the Yuan dynasty. The Sakya see was ruled in this period by Zangpo Pal (1306–1323); one of his many sons, Kunga Lotro Gyaltsen, succeeded Sanggye Pal at his demise in 1314.

== See also ==
- Tibet under Yuan rule
- History of Tibet
- Mongol Empire
- Sakya Trizin

Preceded by Jamyang Rinchen Gyaltsen	Tibetan Imperial Preceptor; 1305–1314	Succeeded by Kunga Lotro Gyaltsen
