= List of rulers of Tibet =

This article lists the rulers of Tibet from the beginning of legendary history. Included are regimes with their base in Central Tibet, that held authority over at least a substantial portion of the country.

== Pre-Imperial Yarlung dynasty ==
#	Name	Reign	Religion
1	Nyatri Tsenpo	127 BCE – ???	Yungdrung Bon
2	Mutri Tsenpo		Yungdrung Bon
3	Dingtri Tsenpo		Yungdrung Bon
4	Sotri Tsenpo		Yungdrung Bon
5	Mertri Tsenpo		Yungdrung Bon
6	Dakrri Tsenpo		Yungdrung Bon
7	Siptri Tsenpo		Yungdrung Bon
8	Drigum Tsenpo		Yungdrung Bon
9	Chatri Tsenpo		Yungdrung Bon
10	Esho Lek		Yungdrung Bon
11	Desho Lek		Yungdrung Bon
12	Tisho Lek		Yungdrung Bon
13	Guru Lek		Yungdrung Bon
14	Trongzhi Lek		Yungdrung Bon
15	Isho Lek		Yungdrung Bon
16	Zanam Zindé		Yungdrung Bon
17	Detrul Namshungtsen		Yungdrung Bon
18	Senöl Namdé		Yungdrung Bon
19	Senöl Podé		Yungdrung Bon
20	Senöl Nam		Yungdrung Bon
21	Senöl Po		Yungdrung Bon
22	Degyel Po		Yungdrung Bon
23	Detrin Tsen		Yungdrung Bon
24	Tori Longtsen		Yungdrung Bon
25	Tritsen Nam		Yungdrung Bon
26	Tridra Pungtsen		Yungdrung Bon
27	Tritog Jetsen		Yungdrung Bon
28	Lha Thothori Nyantsen		Yungdrung Bon
29	Trinyen Zungtsen		Yungdrung Bon
30	Drongnyen Deu		Yungdrung Bon
31	Tagbu Nyasig		Yungdrung Bon
32	Namri Songtsen	570–618	Yungdrung Bon

== Tibetan Empire ==
#	Name	Reign	Religion
1	Songtsen Gampo	614–648, 655–660	Tibetan Buddhism
2	Gungsong Gungtsen	649–655	Tibetan Buddhism
3	Mangsong Mangtsen	660–676	Tibetan Buddhism
4	Tridu Songtsen	676–704	Tibetan Buddhism
5	Tride Tsuktsen Me Agtsom	705–755	Tibetan Buddhism
6	Trisong Detsen	755–797	Tibetan Buddhism
7	Murub or Mune Tsenpo	797–799	Tibetan Buddhism
8	Mutik Tsenpo (Sadnalegs)	800–815	Tibetan Buddhism
9	Ralpachen	815–838	Tibetan Buddhism
10	Langdarma	841–842	Yungdrung Bon

== Yuan dynasty and Sakya rulers ==
=== Sakya lamas ===
- Sakya Pandita Kunga Gyaltsen 1216–1251 (Mongol protégé 1247)
- Phagpa Drakpa Gyaltsen 1251–1280 (nephew)
- Dharmapala Raksita 1280–1282 (nephew)
- Jamyang Rinchen Gyaltsen 1286–1303 (of Sharpa lineage)
- Zangpo Pal 1306–1323 (nephew of Phagpa Drakpa Gyaltsen)
- Khatsun Namkha Lekpa Gyaltsen 1325–1341 (son)
- Jamyang Donyo Gyaltsen 1341–1344 (brother)
- Lama Dampa Sonam Gyaltsen 1344–1347 (brother)
- Lotro Gyaltsen 1347–1365 (nephew)

=== Sakya Imperial Preceptors (Dishi) ===
- Phagpa Lodro Gyaltsen 1270–1274
- Rinchen Gyaltsen 1274–1279 (brother)
- Dharmapala Raksita 1282–1286 (nephew)
- Yeshe Rinchen 1286–1291
- Drakpa Odzer 1291–1303
- Jamyang Rinchen Gyaltsen 1304–1305 (brother of Yeshe Rinchen)
- Sanggye Pal 1305–1314 (brother of Drakpa Odzer)
- Kunga Lotro Gyaltsen 1314–1327 (grandnephew of Phagpa Drakpa Gyaltsen)
- Kunga Lekpa Jungne Gyaltsen 1327–1330 (brother)
- Kunga Gyaltsen 1331–1358 (brother)

=== Dpon-chens (Ponchens) ===
- Shakya Zangpo circa 1264–1270
- Kunga Zangpo circa 1270–1275
- Zhangtsun circa 1275–?
- Chukpo Gangkarwa ?–1280
- Changchub Rinchen 1281/82
- Kunga Zhonnu 1282–circa 1285
- Zhonnu Wangchuk circa 1285–1288
- Changchub Dorje circa 1289
- Aglen Dorje Pal circa 1290–1298
- Zhonnu Wangchuk 1298 (second time)
- Lekpa Pal 1298–circa 1305
- Sengge Pal early 14th century
- Odzer Sengge circa 1315–1317
- Kunga Rinchen circa 1319
- Donyo Pal circa 1320
- Yontsun Drakpa Dar before 1322
- Odzer Sengge ?–1328/29 (second time)
- Gyalwa Zangpo 1328/29–1333
- Wangchuk Pal 1333–1337
- Sonam Pal 1337–1344
- Gyalwa Zangpo 1344–1347 (second time)
- Wangtson 1347–circa 1350
- Gyalwa Zangpo circa 1350–1356/58 (third time)
- Namkha Tenpai Gyaltsen circa 1357
- Palbum ?–1360
- Namkha Tenpai Gyaltsen circa 1364 (second time)

== Phagmodrupa dynasty ==
- Tai Situ Changchub Gyaltsen 1354–1364
- Jamyang Shakya Gyaltsen 1364–1373 (nephew)
- Drakpa Changchub 1374–1381 (nephew)
- Sonam Drakpa 1381–1385 (brother)
- Drakpa Gyaltsen 1385–1432 (cousin)
- Drakpa Jungne 1432–1445 (nephew)
- Kunga Lekpa 1448–1481 (brother)
- Ngagi Wangpo 1481–1491 (son of Drakpa Jungne)
- Tsokye Dorje 1491–1499 (regent, of Rinpungpa lineage)
- Ngawang Tashi Drakpa 1499–1554 (son of Ngagi Wangpo)
- Ngawang Drakpa Gyaltsen 1554–1556/57 (grandson)
- Ngawang Tashi Drakpa 1556/57–1564 (second time)
- Ngawang Drakpa Gyaltsen 1576–1603/04 (second time)
- Mipham Wanggyur Gyalpo 1604–1613 (possible grandnephew)
- Mipham Sonam Wangchuk Drakpa Namgyal Palzang 17th century (grandson of Ngawang Drakpa Gyaltsen)

== Rinpungpa dynasty ==
- Norzang 1435–1466
- Kunzang 1466–circa 1479 (son)
- Donyo Dorje circa 1479–1512 (son)
- Ngawang Namgyal 1512–1544 (cousin)
- Dondup Tseten Dorje 1544–? (son)
- Ngawang Jigme Drakpa 1547–1565 (brother)

== Tsangpa dynasty ==
- Karma Tseten 1565–1599
- Khunpang Lhawang Dorje circa 1582 – 1605/06 (son)
- Karma Thutob Namgyal circa 1586–1610 (brother)
- Karma Tensung 1599–1611 (brother)
- Karma Phuntsok Namgyal 1611–1620 (son of Karma Thutob)
- Karma Tenkyong 1620–1642 (son)

== Gandan Phodrang and Qing dynasty ==
=== Khoshut kings of Tibet ===
- Güshi Khan 1642–1655
- Dayan Khan 1655–1668 (son)
- Tenzin Dalai Khan 1668–1696 (son)
- Tenzin Wangchuk Khan 1696–1697 (son)
- Labzang Khan 1697–1717 (brother)

=== Dalai Lamas ===
- 5th Dalai Lama (Ngawang Lobsang Gyatso, 1642–1682)
  Regents (Desi): Sonam Rapten (1642–1658), Depa Norbu (1659–1660), Trinlé Gyatso (1660–1668), Lozang Tutop (1669–1675), Lozang Jinpa (1675–1679), Sangye Gyatso (1679–1703)
- 6th Dalai Lama (Tsangyang Gyatso, 1697–1706)
  Regents: Ngawang Rinchen (1703–1706), Khangchennä (1721–1728)
- 7th Dalai Lama (Kelzang Gyatso, 1720–1757)
  Regents: Polhanas (1728–1747), Gyurme Namgyal (1747–1750), the sixth Demo Rinpoche (1757–1777)
- 8th Dalai Lama (Jamphel Gyatso, 1762–1804)
  Regents: the 1st Tsemonling Rinpoche (1777–1786), Yeshe Lobsang Tenpai Gonpo, the 8th Kundeling Lama (1791–1811), the 7th Demo Rinpoche (1811–1818)
- 9th Dalai Lama (Lungtok Gyatso, 1810–1815)
  Regent: the 2nd Tsemonling Lama (1819–1844)
- 10th Dalai Lama (Tsultrim Gyatso, 1826–1837)
  Regent: Ngawang Yeshe Tsultrim Gyaltsen, the 3rd Reting Rinpoche (1845–1862)
- 11th Dalai Lama (Khedrup Gyatso, 1842–1856)
- 12th Dalai Lama (Trinley Gyatso, 1860–1875)
  Regents: Shatra Wangchuk Gyalpo (1862–1864), Dedruk Khyenrab Wangchuk (1864–1873), the 10th Kundeling Lama Tatsak Ngawang Pelden (1875–1886)
- 13th Dalai Lama (Thubten Gyatso, 1879–1933)
  Regents: The 9th Demo Rinpoche Lobsang Trinlé (1886–1895), the 3rd Tsemonling Rinpoche Ngawang Lobsang Tenpey Gyaltsen (1910–1912)
- 14th Dalai Lama (Tenzin Gyatso, 1940–Present)
  Regents: the 5th Reting Rinpoche, Jamphel Yeshe Gyaltsen (1934–1941), followed by the 3rd Taktra Rinpoche, Ngawang Sungrab Thutob (1941–1950).

=== Dzungar occupation ===
- Tagtsepa (deputy of Tsewang Rabtan) 1717–1720

=== Qing rule ===
==== Rule by Lay Aristocrats ====
- Khangchenné 1721–1727
- Polhané Sönam Topgyé 1728–1747
- Gyurme Namgyal 1747–1750 (son)

==== Qing imperial residents (Ambans) ====
- Sengge 1727–1733 (first)
- Lianyu 1906–1912 (last)

=== 20th century Silöns (prime ministers) ===
- Changkhyim 1907–1920
- Paljor Dorje Shatra 1907–1923
- Sholkhang 1907–1926
- Langdün Künga Wangchuk 1926–1940
- acting silöns: Lobsang Tashi and Lukhangwa 1950–1952

== See also ==
- History of Tibet
- Pre-Imperial Tibet
- Tibetan Empire
- List of emperors of Tibet
- Guge
- Sakya
- Mongol invasions of Tibet
- Tibet under Yuan rule
- Phagmodrupa dynasty
- Rinpungpa
- Tsangpa
- Ganden Phodrang
- Dalai Lama
- Panchen Lama
- Khoshut Khanate
- Dzungar Khanate
- Chinese expedition to Tibet (1720)
- Tibet under Qing rule
- Tibet (1912–1951)
- List of modern political leaders of Tibet
