= Jamyang Rinchen Gyaltsen =

6th Sakya Tibetan ruler (1257-1305)

Jamyang Rinchen Gyeltsen (Wylie: jam dbyangs rin chen rgyal mtshan), who lived from 1257 to 5 February 1305, was the ruler of the Sakya school of Tibetan Buddhism, which had precedence in Tibet under the Yuan dynasty, in 1286–1303. He also held the title of Imperial Preceptor ( Dishi) from 1304 to his demise in 1305.

== Rise of the Sharpa family ==
The Khön family, hereditary abbot-rulers of Sakya, acquired a leading position in Tibet after the Mongol conquest of Tibet. Drogön Chögyal Phagpa (d. 1280) held a high position at the court of the Khagan and exerted influence over Tibetan affairs. Under the abbot were the so-called Three Schools: the eastern (Shar), western (Nub), and middle (Gun). The Shar school was associated with a family of Zhangzhung origins, of the Old Tantra school (Ngag Nyingmawa). One of their line, Chukpo Jetsun Kyab, had three sons, all disciples of Phagpa. They were Yeshe Rinchen, Kunga Senge, and Jamyang Rinchen Gyaltsen. After the young Sakya Dishi Dharmapala Raksita vacated his position in 1286 and died in 1287, Khagan Kublai Khan suspended the influence of the Khön family. Instead the Shar or Sharpa family came to the fore. This was possibly due to their good relations with the influential Yuan minister Sangge. Yeshe Rinchen was appointed Dishi by orders of Kublai Khan, while his youngest brother Jamyang Rinchen Gyeltsen became the acting abbot (Wylie: bla chos) of the Sakya school. The appointments gave the Sharpa brothers influence in Tibet, but neither of them was the executive ruler of the land. This task was performed by a series of administrators (dpon-chen or pönchen) who resided in Sakya. In the time of Jamyang Rinchen Gyeltsen they were:

- Zhonnu Wangchuk (c. 1285–1288)
- Changchub Dorje (c. 1289)
- Aglen Dorje Pal (c. 1290–1298)
- Zhonnu Wangchuk (1298, second time)
- Lekpa Pal (1298-c. 1305)

== Anti-Mongol rebellion ==
The accession of Jamyang Rinchen Gyaltsen coincided with increasing unrest in Central Tibet. The center of anti-Yuan resistance was the important Drigung Monastery, which headed a full-scale rebellion in 1287. At first the impoverished Mongol garrisons in Tibet were unable to quell the resistance. After three years, the new dpon-chen Aglen received a fresh detachment of Mongol troops under the prince Temür Buqa, accompanied by the militia of the 13 myriarchies (divisions) of Central Tibet. The Drigung troops received assistance from the Chaghatai Mongols but suffered a defeat at Palmothang, after which the monastery was assaulted and torched. Most of the defenders inside were cut down including the administrator of Drigung. The abbot, however, managed to escape. Surviving Chaghatai troops succumbed in a snowstorm which was supposedly produced by the powerful magic skills of the cleric Zur Shakya Sengge. After this bloody victory the Yuan troops marched through the south-eastern part of Tibet, towards Assam, confirming Mongol and Sakya rule in these quarters.

== Yuan-Sakya rule unchallenged ==
The crushing of the rebellion in 1290 meant that the system of Yuan overlordship assisted by Sakya was secured for the next four decades. Nevertheless, the position of the Sharpa family was probably weakened by the downfall and execution of their powerful ally Sangge in 1291. The elder Sharpa brother Yeshe Rinchen resigned as Dishi in the same year, dying three years later. After the death of Kublai Khan in 1294 the dpon-chen Aglen suggested that a scion of the old Khön family should be allowed to rule Sakya instead of Jamyang Rinchen Gyaltsen. This would be Zangpo Pal, a nephew of Phagpa, who presently stayed in South China. As a matter of fact the new great khan Temür acknowledged Zangpo Pal as the right heir and let him return to Sakya in 1298. Jamyang Rinchen Gyaltsen nominally handed over the abbot-ship, but continued to direct Sakya affairs from the official abbot's palace Zhitog. It was only in 1303 that he was summoned to Beijing by the Great Khan. Being a loyal and experienced man, he was ordered to take up the position of Dishi after the death of the former title-holder. Arriving at the imperial court he was officially installed on 23 February 1304. However, he already died on 5 February 1305.

== See also ==
- Tibet under Yuan rule
- History of Tibet
- Mongol Empire
- Sakya Trizin

Preceded by Dharmapala Raksita	Sakya lama of Tibet (Yuan overlordship); 1286–1303	Succeeded by Zangpo Pal
Preceded by Drakpa Odzer	Tibetan Imperial Preceptor; 1304–1305	Succeeded by Sanggye Pal
