= Kunga Gyaltsen (Imperial Preceptor) =

10th Sakya Tibetan ruler (1310–1358)

Kunga Gyaltsen (Wylie: Kun dga' rgyal mts'an) was a Tibetan Imperial Preceptor (Dishi) at the court of the Mongol-led Yuan dynasty. He lived from 1310–1358 and belonged to the abbot family Khon of Sakya which had a precedent position in Tibet in this era. He held the title from 1331 to 1358, being the last Dishi before the takeover of the Phagmodrupa dynasty in Central Tibet in the 1350s.

== Appointment as Imperial Preceptor ==
In the four decades after the death of the abbot-ruler of Sakya Zangpo Pal in 1323, the functions of abbot-ruler (dansa chenpo) and Imperial Preceptor (Dishi) were held in turn by a number of his sons and grandsons. By this time, however, the ruling Khon family was split into four groups, each residing in a particular palace in Sakya. Kunga Gyaltsen was one of the younger sons of Zangpo Pal and belonged to the Lhakhang branch. His mother was Machig Yon Dagmo. During the reign of the great khan Yesün Temür he was appointed to the title chang guhi gung, the meaning of which is unclear. After the death of his brother Kunga Lekpa Jungne Gyaltsen in 1330, Kunga Gyaltsen was selected by the great khan Tugh Temür to become the next Dishi. In 1331 the incarnated hierarch of the Karmapa sect, Rangjung Dorje, arrived with a number of imperial officials to fetch Kunga Gyaltsen and bring him to the capital. Arriving to Dadu (Beijing) he was duly confirmed in his office by the new great khan and last Yuan emperor Toghon Temür on 19 July 1333.

== Decline and fall of Sakya rule ==
At the beginning his authority as imperial preceptor was recognized in Tibet. This is seen by a set of religious rules that he issued in the great temple of Dadu in May 1336. A document preserved in the Zhalu Monastery in 1348 shows that he still had a say in Tibetan affairs at that time. His position was also strengthened by the appointment of his son Lotro Gyaltsen as abbot-ruler of Sakya in 1347. As common in the Khon family, he married and sired children before his full ordination as monk. However, he stayed in Dadu until his death in 1358 and was unable to interfere directly in the civil war that emerged from 1346. One of the 13 myriarchies of Central Tibet, Phagmodru, was headed by the strong-willed and ambitious Changchub Gyaltsen who involved in a complicated series of clashes with rival lords and the Sakya administrators (dpon-chen or ponchen). As Changchub Gyaltsen got the upper hand he managed to dominate Ü (East Central Tibet) by c. 1350. In 1354 he reduced the power of the Sakya elite to its immediate estates in Tsang (West Central Tibet). Kunga Gyaltsen's brother-in-law, the influential lama Kunpangpa, was murdered in 1357 and in the next year Changchub Gyaltsen arranged a conference in Sakya which confirmed the transfer of power over Central Tibet to the new Phagmodrupa regime. Dissatisfied elements within Sakya were ruthlessly defeated. During all these events, Changchub Gyaltsen continued to formally adhere to the Yuan dynasty and received the title Tai Situ from the great khan. When Kunga Gyaltsen died in Dadu in the same year, no successor was appointed for some years. His nephew Sonam Lotro Gyaltsen briefly served as such in 1361–1362, when the Yuan dynasty was in its death throes.

== See also ==
- Tibet under Yuan rule
- History of Tibet
- Mongol Empire
- Sakya Trizin

Preceded by Kunga Lekpa Jungne Gyaltsen	Tibetan Imperial Preceptor; 1331–1358	Succeeded by none
