= Khatsun Namkha Lekpa Gyaltsen =

Sakya Tibetan ruler (1305 -1343)

Khatsun Namkha Lekpa Gyaltsen, orthographic spelling, mK'as btsun nam mk'a legs pa'i rgyal mts'an, who lived from 1305-1343, was a ruler of Sakya, which had a precedence position in Tibet under the Yuan dynasty. He also held the title of guoshi from 1325 to his dethronement in 1341. Since the State Perceptor (Guoshi) had a more localized role, while the Imperial Preceptor (Dishi) held greater authority, he was more prominent in regional religious affairs than centralized ones, and his reign saw the beginning of the decline of Sakya hegemony in Tibet, as they could not effectively put down revolts, leading for the rival Phagmodrupa dynasty to gain significant control of the plateue and in the future, eventually succeed the weakened Mongol administered Sakya dynasty.

== A divided heritage ==
Khatsun Namkha Lekpa Gyaltsen was one of the thirteen sons of the previous abbot-ruler (dansa chenpo) of Sakya, Zangpo Pal. His mother was Macig Yon Dagmo. Shortly before the death of his father, his elder brother, the imperial preceptor Kunga Lotro Gyaltsen, made a division of his brothers into four branches who resided in four different palaces: Zhitog, Lhakhang, Rinchengang, and Ducho. Zangpo Pal died in 1323, and Khatsun, being the head of the Zhitog branch, was installed as upper ruler in 1325. The Yuan emperor Yesün Temür bestowed a seal and the title guanding guoshi. Although he enjoyed considerable religious prestige, Khatsun's actual authority appears to have been quite limited. He is seldom mentioned in the chronicles. Yesün Temür tried to strengthen the position of Sakya by appointing his brother Sonam Zangpo as viceroy of the three cholka (regions) of Tibet: Kham, Amdo and Ü-Tsang. This, however, did not turn out to be particularly effective. A series of administrators (ponchen) handled the affairs of Tibet, although with varying success. During the tenure of Khatsun they were:

- Odzer Sengge (d. 1328/29)
- Gyalwa Zangpo (1328/29-1333)
- Wangchuk Pal (1333-1337)
- Sonam Pal (1337-1344)

== Indian invasion in the Himalayas ==
During the tenure of Khatsun Namkha Lekpa Gyaltsen, Tibet may have been threatened by a military expedition dispatched by Muhammad ibn Tughluq, sultan of Delhi. According to the historian Firishta, "having heard of the great wealth of China, Muhammad Tughluq conceived the idea of subduing that empire; but in order to accomplish his design, it was necessary first to conquer the country of Himachal which lies between the borders of China and India." Himachal refers to Nepal and the lands on both sides of the Himalayas. The near-contemporary historian Ziauddin Barani, on the other side, states that the sultan strove to conquer the mountain of Kara-jal between Hind and China. Despite the warnings of his councilors, Muhammad ibn Tughluq sent a sizable army up to the north in 1337. Firishta relates that the Indians, greatly diminished by hardships, met a large Chinese army at the border and had to fall back, closely followed by the Chinese. On the retreat downhill the sultan's troops suffered terribly from heavy rains and attacks by mountain tribes. Just a few soldiers returned to Delhi, only to be executed by the enraged sultan. Modern historians, however, doubt that Muhammad ibn Tughluq actually entertained the fantastic plan to conquer Tibet and China, and believe that the expedition may have aimed at tribal groups in the far north, towards the border to Tibet.

== Disintegration ==
Already in 1327 a serious conflict arose between the ponchen Odzer Sengge and the Sakya see. However, representatives of the Karmapa sect managed to mediate between the parties. In 1335-1336 the emperor Toghon Temür dispatched two officials to get a tighter grip on the situation in Tibet. They carried out an inspection and revision of the census and taxation, but their presence caused great discontent from the populace. Even more seriously, the Phagmodrupa myriarchy under its dynamic leader Changchub Gyaltsen fell out with the Yazang myriarchy over the border between the two. In order to stop the ambitious Phagmodrupa lord, the Sakya official Wangtson treacherously arrested Changchub Gyaltsen in 1336. Although the prisoner was released by the weak-willed ponchen Sonam Pal after a while, the event made for future clashes. The abbot-ruler Khatsun had little or no part in the political trouble at the time. However, the Zhitog and Rinchengang branches of Sakya had a clash in 1341, and Khatsun was forced to step down, leaving the dignity to his brother Jamyang Donyo Gyaltsen. He died two years later, and civil war flared up in Central Tibet shortly afterwards.

== See also ==
- Tibet under Yuan rule
- History of Tibet
- Mongol Empire
- Sakya Trizin

Preceded by Zangpo Pal	Sakya lama of Tibet (Yuan overlordship); 1325–1341	Succeeded by Jamyang Donyo Gyaltsen
