= Künga Gyaltsen =

Künga Gyaltsen may refer to:

- Kunga Gyaltsen (Imperial Preceptor)
- Another name for Sakya Pandita
- The first in the line of Trungpa tülkus
