= Zangpo Pal =

Sakya Tibetan lama and ruler (1261–1323)

Zangpo Pal or Danyi Chenpo Zangpo Pal (Wylie: bDag nyid chen po bzang po dpal), who lived from 1261–1323, was the ruler of Sakya, which held a precedence position in Tibet under the Yuan dynasty. He also held the title of Imperial Preceptor (Dishi) from 1298, to his demise in 1323.

== Family and upbringing ==
Zangpo Pal belonged to the Khon family, hereditary abbot-rulers of Sakya. The family obtained a leading position in Tibet under his uncle Phagpa who, as a Buddhist intellectual, enjoyed the confidence of the Mongol ruler Kublai Khan, founder of the Yuan dynasty. Phagpa's brother Yeshe Jungne (1238–1274) lived in Yunnan in south-western China where he was the household lama of Kublai Khan's son Hügechi. He married Jomo Rinchen Kyi of the Palrin family and begot a son called Zangpo Pal. The boy was brought up in Sakya but neglected his religious studies, the raison d'être of the Khon family. At 21 years of age he was summoned to the imperial court in Beijing on the initiative of Kublai Khan's consort Abu. Later, however, he became persona non grata as doubts were cast on his legitimacy. Zangpo Pal was banished to an island off the coast of South China. He was the only remaining member of the Khon family after the death of his cousin Dharmapala Raksita in 1287, but was passed over for succession. Kublai Khan handed over the Sakya estates to a member of the Sharpa family, Jamyang Rinchen Gyaltsen, while the latter's brother Yeshe Rinchen was appointed Imperial Preceptor (Dishi) with influence over Tibetan affairs.

== Elevation to the Sakya see ==
After the death of Kublai Khan in 1294, a movement to bring back Zangpo Pal as the Sakya ruler emerged. The administrator (dpon-chen or ponchen) Aglen took the initiative to summon a council in Sakya on the matter. The officials agreed to send a petition to the Dishi in Beijing, Drakpa Odzer. The issue was brought before the great khan Temür who found it wisest to approve. Zangpo Pal was recalled from his island in 1296 and arrived at Sakya in 1298. To strengthen his position, Temür provided him with a Mongol princess, Müdegen. On the great khan's order, he also married five further wives who belonged to the highest nobility of Tibet. Although Zangpo Pal was given the formal reins of power, Jamyang Rinchen Gyaltsen retained actual power until 1303 when he was summoned to the imperial court to take up the position of Dishi. In the meanwhile Zangpo Pal continued his religious studies. He is said to have been a rustic figure with a bad temper and foul language. It was only in 1306 that he formally took over the full dignity of abbot-ruler of Sakya. In 1311 the great khan endowed him with the title Guoshi (State Preceptor), and two years later he took his vows as a fully ordained monk. By this time he had begotten a multitude of children, including 13 sons. Conditions in Tibet were generally peaceful in his days. The thirteen trikor (myriarchies) of Central Tibet were administered by a series of dpon-chen:

- Sengge Pal (early 14th century)
- Odzer Sengge (c. 1315–1317)
- Kunga Rinchen (c. 1319)
- Donyo Pal (c. 1320)
- Yontsun Drakpa Dar (before 1322)
- Odzer Sengge (?-1328/29, second time)

== Seeds of dissent ==
The family network of Zangpo Pal, and the imperial favours he enjoyed, once again gave the Khon lineage a degree of influence over Tibet. His son Kunga Lotro Gyaltsen was appointed Dishi in 1314. The dignity of Dishi was subsequently held by a number of his descendants up to 1362. As imperial preceptors they had a say in the affairs of Tibet, since their orders were issued in the name of the supreme imperial authority. However, the proliferation of sons in the family made for internal rivalries in the Khon family. When the Dishi Kunga Lotro Gyaltsen returned to Sakya from Beijing in 1322, he took the initiative of dividing the siblings into four groups, each of which was given a part of Zangpo Pal's heritage. The branches (ladrang) were named after the palaces where they resided:

- The branch of the Zhitog palace, official residence of the abbot-ruler up to 1959.
- The branch of the Lhakhang palace.
- The branch of the Rinchengang palace, north-east of Zhitog.
- The branch of the Ducho palace, south-east of Zhitog.

The consequences of this were serious. Each palace had an abbot (dansa) and the actual abbot-ruler (dansa chenpo) had only nominal superiority. With internal unity weakened, the Sakya elite was unable to prevent increasing unrest in the various myriarchies of Central Tibet. When Zangpo Pal died, probably in 1323, a new star was already rising in the political landscape of Tibet: the Phagmodrupa myriarchy which would eventually take over power from Sakya in the 1350s.

== See also ==
- Tibet under Yuan rule
- History of Tibet
- Mongol Empire
- Sakya Trizin

Preceded by Jamyang Rinchen Gyaltsen	Sakya lama of Tibet (Yuan overlordship); 1306–1323	Succeeded by Khatsun Namkha Lekpa Gyaltsen
