= Kunga Lotro Gyaltsen =

8th Sakya Tibetan ruler (1299-1327)

Kunga Lotro Gyaltsen (Wylie: Kun dga' blo gros rgyal mts'an) was a Tibetan Imperial Preceptor (Dishi) at the court of the Mongol-led Yuan dynasty of China. He lived from 1299-1327 and belonged to the abbot family Khon of Sakya which had a precedence position in Tibet in this era. He held the title from 1314 to his demise in 1327.

== Appointment as Imperial Preceptor ==
Kunga Lotro Gyaltsen was one of the 13 sons of the abbot-ruler (dansa chenpo) Zangpo Pal (d. 1323). His mother was Jomo Kunga Bumphulwa, the widow of the Tibetan administrator (dpon-chen or ponchen) Aglen. The position of Imperial Preceptor or Dishi was always kept separate from that of abbot-ruler, and since 1286 it had been held by members of the Sharpa and Khangsarpa families. However, after the demise of the Dishi Sanggye Pal in 1314, a member of the Khon family was once again appointed. Kunga Lotro Gyaltsen was summoned to the imperial court in North China by the great khan Ayurbarwada, and formally installed on 27 March 1315. As Dishi he had a paramount influence in the Bureau of Buddhist and Tibetan Affairs or Xuanzheng Yuan, the department handling Buddhist and Tibetan affairs. His decrees carried the weight of the imperial authority. A letter by his hand, issued in 1316, begins: "By the king's order, the words of Kunga Lotro Gyaltsen Palzangpo, imperial preceptor: To the officials of Pacification Commissioner rank, to generals, soldiers, administrators of the nang so, to judges, holders of golden letters, chiefs of districts, laymen and monks who collect taxes and go and come, to myriarchs, to dignitaries, a command."

== Division of the Khon family ==
The period c. 1290-1330 was relatively stable, since the Yuan-Sakya system of governance had finally been accepted after much bloodshed. The serious decline of the Yuan Dynasty had still not set in. The tenure of Kunga Lotro Gyaltsen spanned over the reigns of the great khans Ayurbarwada, Gegeen Khan, and Yesün Temür Khan. However, this period also saw a family situation of the Khon family that planted the seeds of future dissent. In 1322 Kunga Lotro Gyaltsen returned to Sakya from Beijing in order to receive his final ordination as monk. On arrival he proceeded to bring order in the heritage of his aging father. The reason was either that the great khan had ordered him to do so, or the difficulties to discipline his numerous brothers. In the end he divided the brothers into four groups. Each group would receive part of the heritage and had their own residence (ladrang) in Sakya. They were the Zhitog, Lhakang, Rinchengang, and Ducho branches, each of which had its own abbot (dansa). The partition was finalized in late 1323 or early 1324, shortly after the death of the old Zangpo Pal. In practice it meant that the prestige and influence of Sakya was weakened. One of the brothers, Khatsun Namkha Lekpa Gyaltsen was formal abbot-ruler after the death of his father, but seems to have exercised limited authority. As for Kunga Lotro Gyaltsen he returned to the imperial capital in the summer of 1324. In 1326 his health declined and he prepared to leave for his Tibetan homeland again. He did not actually leave the capital, however, possibly because of a revolt that broke out in Amdo in eastern Tibet. He died on 6 March 1327. His successor was a brother, Kunga Lekpa Jungne Gyaltsen.

== See also ==
- Tibet under Yuan rule
- History of Tibet
- Mongol Empire
- Sakya Trizin

Preceded by Sanggye Pal	Tibetan Imperial Preceptor; 1314–1327	Succeeded by Kunga Lekpa Jungne Gyaltsen
