= Yeshe Rinchen =

4th Sakya Tibetan ruler (1248-1294)

Yeshe Rinchen (Wylie: Ye shes rin c'en) was a Tibetan Imperial Preceptor (Dishi) at the court of the Mongol-led Yuan dynasty. He lived from 1248-1294 and hailed from Sakya, the foremost monastic regime in Tibet in this period, and held the title from 1286 to his dethronement in 1291.

== Sakya and the Sharpa lineage ==
In the course of the 13th century, the Sakya abbots Sakya Pandita and Phagpa forged a working relationship with the Mongol conquerors, becoming their agents in Tibetan affairs. In 1270, Phagpa was appointed Imperial Preceptor (Dishi) by Kublai Khan. This office was not merely religious but also political: the Dishi exerted a paramount influence in the Bureau of Buddhist and Tibetan Affairs (Xuanzheng Yuan) which was the office that oversaw Buddhist and Tibetan affairs. His decrees bore the same weight as the great khan in Central Tibet. He usually resided close to the Yuan emperor. The first three Dishi belonged to the Khon lineage, members of which were hereditary abbots of the Sakya Monastery. The disciples of the abbots Sakya Pandita and Phagpa were grouped in the so-called Three Schools, namely the eastern (Shar), western (Nub) and middle (Gun). The Shar was headed by a family of Zhangzhung origins, known as Sharpa.

== Yeshe Rinchen and his tenure as Dishi ==
Yeshe Rinchen was born into the Sharpa lineage in 1248, being the son of Chukpo Jetsun Kyab. As a young man he was the disciple of Phagpa. In 1274 the clerics of Sakya sent him to Shingkun (Lintao) where Phagpa resided, where he invited his master back. The Dishi dignity was taken over, first by Rinchen Gyaltsen and later by Dharmapala Raksita. The last-mentioned vacated his position in 1286 and headed back for Sakya, dying on the way in 1287. There were no more fully ordained members of the Khon lineage left, and the void was filled by members of the Sharpa lineage. Yeshe Rinchen was appointed Dishi at the imperial court, while his brother Jamyang Rinchen Gyaltsen became the ruling abbot of Sakya. It is possible that the Sharpa brothers were the protegees of the influential imperial minister Sangge. The tenure of Yeshe Rinchen coincided with the great Tibetan rebellion headed by the Drigung Monastery in 1287–1290, which was finally crushed by the administrator Aglen. In the next year 1291, Sangge fell from power and was executed. Probably this made Yeshe Rinchen's position untenable. He stepped down from the position as Dishi and was succeeded by Drakpa Odzer. He then withdrew to the sacred Buddhist site Mount Wutai in present-day Shanxi. He died there in 1294.

== See also ==
- Tibet under Yuan rule
- History of Tibet
- Mongol Empire
- Sakya Trizin

Preceded by Dharmapala Raksita	Tibetan Imperial Preceptor; 1286–1291	Succeeded by Drakpa Odzer
