= Dharmapala Raksita =

3rd Sakya Tibetan ruler (1268–1287)

Dharmapala Raksita (Wylie: d+harma pA la rak Shi ta), who lived from 1268 to December 1287, was the head of the Sakya school of Tibetan Buddhism, which was the most powerful school in Tibet under the Yuan dynasty from 1280 to 1282. He also held the title of Imperial Preceptor (Dishi), from 1282 to 1286.

== Background ==
The Mongols had interfered in the political affairs of Tibet since c. 1240, using the senior lamas of the Sakya monastery as middlemen. A Mongol administration was set up in 1268-1269 and a census was taken. Central Tibet was divided into 13 trikor (Wylie: khri skor) or myriarchies. The temporal administrator of Tibet was called dpon-chen (ponchen) and resided in Sakya since about 1264. The abbot-rulers of the Sakya see enjoyed a precedence position, based on their personal ties with the Mongol great khans. This was in particular the case with Drogön Chögyal Phagpa (1235–1280), who also held the position of Imperial Preceptor (Dishi) at the Yuan court. The succeeding Imperial Preceptors always belonged to the clergymen of Sakya although they did not always belong to the line of ruling abbots, the Khon family. Neither the abbot-ruler or Dishi were, however, viceroys of Tibet as sometimes stated. Nevertheless, the Dishi issued orders in the name of the supreme imperial authority which gave some of them great influence.

== Becoming the Imperial Preceptor ==
Dharmapala Raksita was born in 1268 as the posthumous son of Chakna Dorje (Wylie: phyag na rdo rje, 1239–1267), a brother of the Sakya lord Phagpa. Chakna was thoroughly Mongolized, dressed in Mongol clothing and was eventually appointed viceroy of the three cholkas (regions) of Tibet. He married Megadung, a daughter of the Mongol prince Godan Khan and great-granddaughter of Genghis Khan. His son Dharmapala was born from another consort, Khadrobum of Zhalu. Being fatherless at birth, his uncle Phagpa entrusted his upbringing to the lord of Zhalu.

When Phagpa died in December 1280, poisoned according to the rumours, Kublai Khan sent an army of Mongols and Amdo Tibetans into Ü-Tsang in order to control the tense situation. The former dpon-chen Kunga Zangpo, suspected of orchestrating Phagpa's death, was caught and executed. The troops were strategically deployed in the central parts of the country, and at the borders. This was the first permanent occupation of Tibet by Mongol troops.

Dharmapala inherited his uncle's position as lord of Sakya and performed the funeral rites. In 1281 he was summoned to appear before Kublai Khan in Beijing and was formally appointed Dishi in 1282 at the age of 14, succeeding his other uncle, Rinchen Gyaltsen. He was nevertheless still a layman and never became an abbot. During the next years he stayed close to the great khan and engaged in building activity. Thus he had a stupa erected to the memory of Phagpa, furthermore building the monastery Metog Raba which remained the official residence for the Dishi until the end of the Yuan dynasty.

== Developments in Central Tibet ==
The real authority in Central Tibet during these years rested with the dpon-chen. A Changchub Rinchen was appointed by Khubilai Khan in 1281, but soon fell ill and died or was murdered (1281/82). He was succeeded by Kunga Zhonnu (1282-c. 1285) and Zhonnu Wangchuk (c. 1285–1288). At this time Central Tibet was severely impoverished. Kunga Zhonnu ordered a tax remission and in 1287 a revision of the 1268 census was carried out to establish a sounder fiscal base. As for Dharmapala he vacated his position as Dishi in 1286 and departed from the imperial court to revisit Tibet and Sakya. However, he died on his way at Tre Mandala (Chuwo) on 24 December 1287. He was married to Palden, a granddaughter of Köden, and also to a lady from Zhalu called Jowo Tagibum. The last-mentioned bore him a son Ratnabhadra who died at the age of five. Thus this branch of the Khon family died out. Khubilai Khan appointed a Sakya abbot and a Dishi, neither of whom belonged to the Khon lineage. It was only in 1306 that Sakya was once again ruled by a relative of Dharmapala, Zangpo Pal.

== See also ==
- Tibet under Yuan rule
- History of Tibet
- Mongol Empire
- Sakya Trizin

Preceded by Phagpa	Sakya lama of Tibet (Yuan overlordship); 1280–1282	Succeeded by Jamyang Rinchen Gyaltsen
Preceded by Rinchen Gyaltsen	Tibetan Imperial Preceptor; 1282–1286	Succeeded by Yeshe Rinchen
