= Ponpori Hills =

Hills in Tibet, China

The Ponpori hills are a range of hills with grey soil, southwest of Shigatse, in southwestern Tibet. The Drum River runs through them.

They are best known as the location of the central monastery of the Sakya, one of the four great traditions of Tibetan Mahayana Buddhism. Sakya (Tibetan: sa skya, grey or whitish soil) is named after a patch of white earth in the shape of a lion's face on the mountainside.
