= Rinchen Gyaltsen =

2nd Sakya Tibetan ruler (1238-1279/1282)

Rinchen Gyaltsen (Tibetan: རིན་ཆེན་རྒྱལ་མཚན, Wylie: rin chen rgyal mtshan, THL: rinchen gyaltsen) who lived from 1238 to 24 March 1279, was a Tibetan imperial preceptor at the court of the Mongol-led Yuan dynasty of China. His reign lasted from 1274 to his demise in either 1279 or 1282.

== Family background ==
Rinchen Gyaltsen was born in 1238 as the son of Zangtsa Sonam Gyaltsen and his wife Jomo Dro. His father belonged to the Khon family, members of which were hereditary abbot-rulers of the Sakya Monastery in Tsang in western Tibet. In the time of his uncle, the abbot Sakya Pandita (1182–1251), Sakya became brokers between the various Tibetan petty lords and the Mongol power. Rinchen Gyaltsen's elder half-brother Phagpa enjoyed a close relationship with Kublai Khan and was appointed to the title Imperial Preceptor (Dishi) in 1270. As such he was a standing institution in the Yuan government, enjoying extraordinary honours and resources. The Dishi had a paramount influence on the Bureau of Buddhist and Tibetan Affairs (Zongzhi Yuan, later Xuanzheng Yuan). Meanwhile, another brother, Chakna Dorje, was the viceroy of Tibet from 1264 to 1267.

== Tenure as Imperial Preceptor ==
Rinchen Gyaltsen served for a time as chaplain (lacho) to Kublai Khan. However, when his brother Chakna Dorje died in 1267, this led to serious unrest as the important Drigung Monastery tried to push back the position of Sakya. When his other brother Phagpa left Sakya and temporarily settled in Amdo in the same year, Rinchen Gyaltsen took over as a "quasi-abbot" (dansa tawu) of the Sakya Monastery. Phagpa arrived to the imperial court in Beijing in 1370 and was appointed Dishi (Imperial Preceptor); however, he renounced the title in 1274 in order to return to Sakya. Instead, Rinchen Gyaltsen was summoned the court to fill the post in the same year. As imperial preceptor he resided in the palace compound Metog Rawa (Flowery Enclosure), as his brother had done. There he gathered a community of clerics. During his tenure the worldly affairs of Tibet were handled by a succession of administrators in Sakya, called dpon-chen (ponchen). They were:

- Shakya Zangpo (c. 1264–1270)
- Kunga Zangpo (c. 1270–1275)
- Zhangtsun (c. 1275-?)
- Chukpo Gangkarwa (?-1280)

Rinchen Gyaltsen died in Shingkun (Lintao) at an uncertain date, most probably 24 March 1279. According to another chronicle he died as late as 1282, which seems to be incorrect. He was succeeded as tishri by his nephew Dharmapala Raksita, a son of the viceroy Chakna Dorje.

== See also ==
- Tibet under Yuan rule
- History of Tibet
- Mongol Empire
- Sakya Trizin

| Preceded by Phagpa | Tibetan imperial preceptor 1274–1279 | Succeeded by Dharmapala Raksita |
