= Sakya =

One of four major schools of Tibetan Buddhism

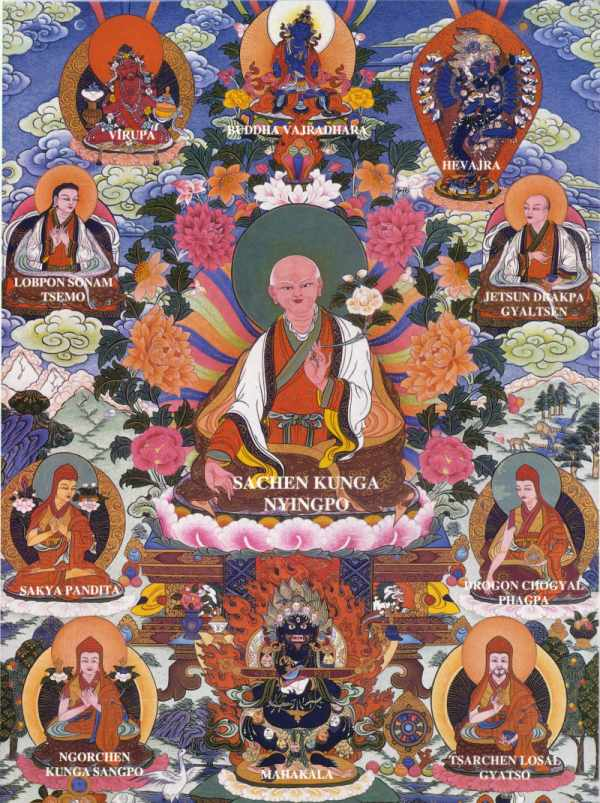
Sakya Lineage Tree

The Sakya (Tibetan: ས་སྐྱ་, Wylie: sa skya, 'pale earth') school is one of four major schools of Tibetan Buddhism, the others being the Nyingma, Kagyu, and Gelug. It is one of the Red Hat Orders along with the Nyingma and Kagyu.

== Origins ==
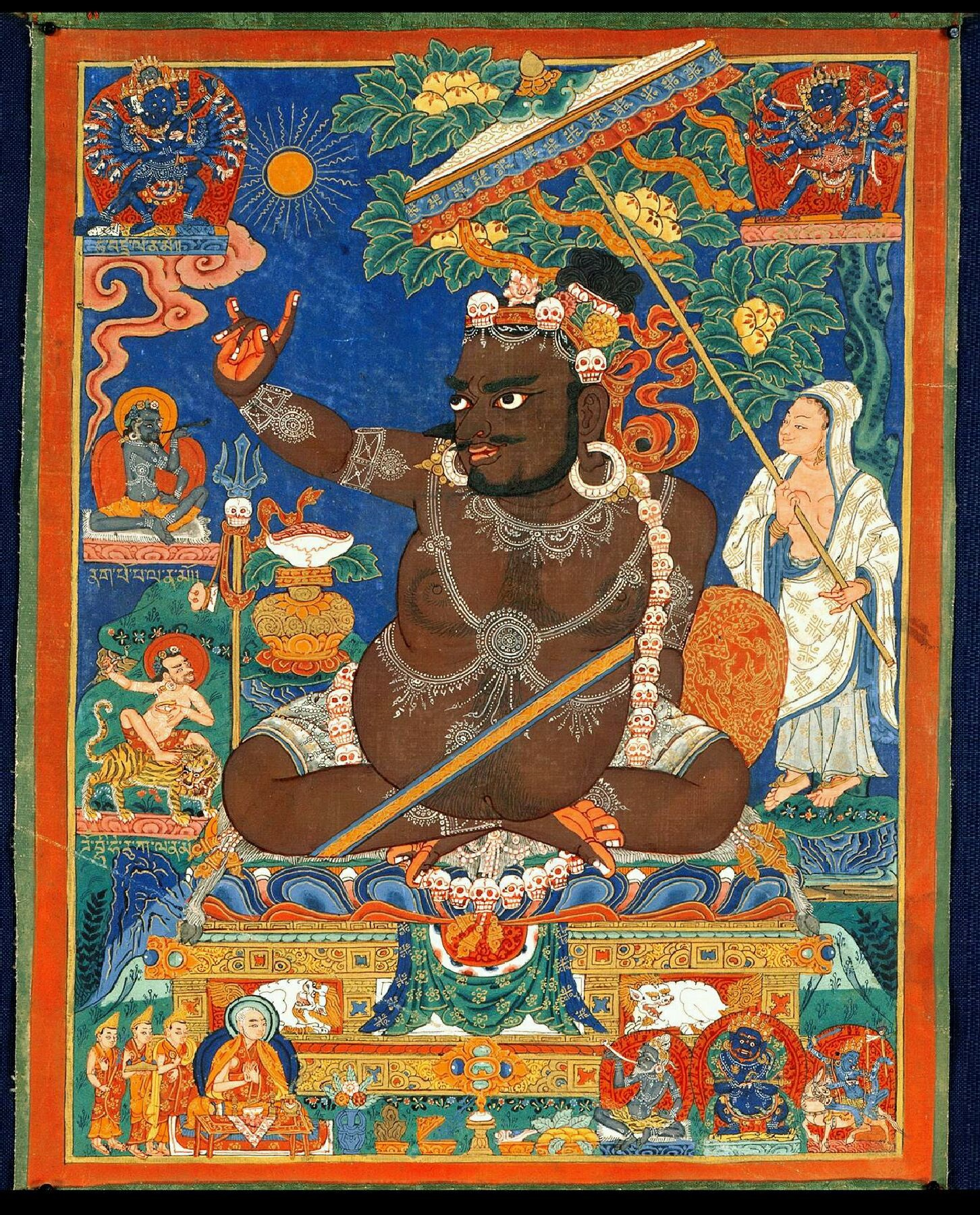
Virūpa, 16th century. It depicts a famous episode in his hagiography when he stopped the sun in the sky.

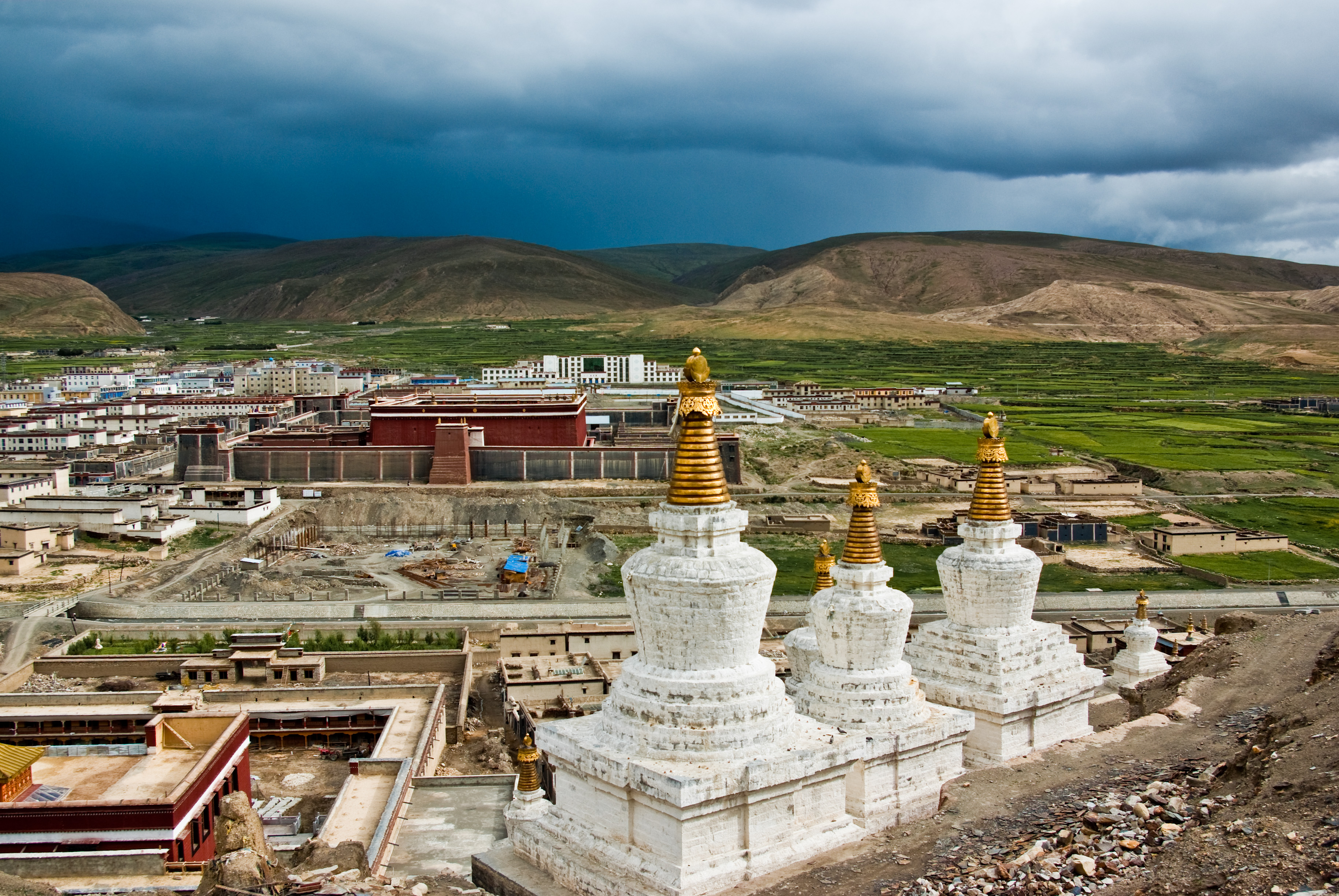
Sakya Monastery

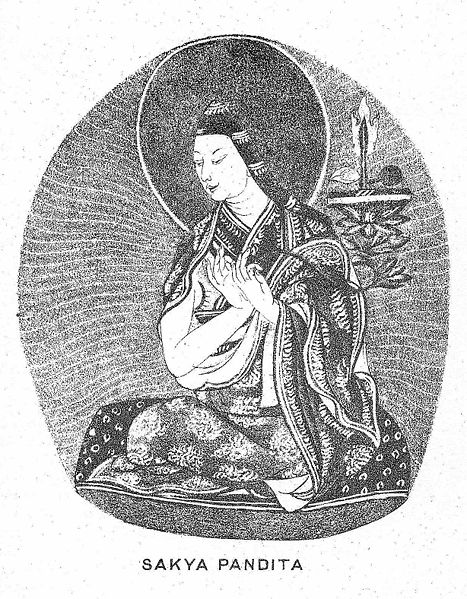
Sakya Pandita

The name Sakya ("pale earth") derives from the unique grey landscape of the Ponpori Hills in southern Tibet near Shigatse, where Sakya Monastery, the first monastery of this tradition, and the seat of the Sakya School was built by Khon Konchog Gyalpo (1034–1102) in 1073.

The Sakya tradition developed during the second period of translation of Buddhist scripture from Sanskrit into Tibetan in the late 11th century. It was founded by Drogmi, a famous scholar and translator who had studied at the Vikramashila directly under Naropa, Ratnākaraśānti, Vāgīśvarakīrti and other great panditas from India for twelve years.

Khon Konchog Gyalpo became Drogmi's disciple on the advice of his elder brother.

The tradition was established by the "Five Venerable Supreme Masters" starting with the grandson of Khonchog Gyalpo, Sachen Kunga Nyingpo, who became known as Sachen, or "Great Sakyapa":

- Sachen Kunga Nyingpo (1092–1158)
- Sonam Tsemo (1142–1182)
- Jetsun Dragpa Gyaltsen (1147–1216)
- Sakya Pandita (1182–1251)
- Drogön Chögyal Phagpa (1235–1280)

Buton Rinchen Drub (1290–1364) was an important scholar and writer and one of Tibet's most celebrated historians. Other notable scholars of the Sakya tradition are the so-called "Six Ornaments of Tibet:"

- Yaktuk Sangyey Pal
- Rongton (1367–1449)
- Ngorchen Kunga Zangpo
- Zongpa Kunga Namgyel
- Gorampa (1429–1489)
- Sakya Chokden (1428–1507)

The leadership of the Sakya School is passed down through a hereditary system between the male members of the Sakya branch of the Khon family.

== Teachings ==
Sachen, the first of the five supreme masters, inherited a wealth of tantric doctrines from numerous Tibetan translators or "lotsawas" who had visited India: most importantly Drokmi Lotsawa, Bari Lotsawa and Mal Lotsawa. From Drokmi comes the supreme teaching of Sakya, the system of Lamdre "Path and its Fruit" deriving from the mahasiddha Virūpa based upon the Hevajra Tantra. Mal Lotsawa introduced to Sakya the esoteric Vajrayogini lineage known as "Naro Khachoma." From Bari Lotsawa came innumerable tantric practices, foremost of which was the cycle of practices known as the One Hundred Sadhanas. Other key transmissions that form part of the Sakya spiritual curriculum include the cycles of Vajrakilaya, Mahākāla and Guhyasamāja tantras.

The fourth Sakya patriarch, Sakya Pandita, was notable for his exceptional scholarship and composed many important and influential texts on sutra and tantra, including "Means of Valid Cognition: A Treasury of Reasoning" (Wylie: tshad ma rigs gter), "Clarifying the Sage's Intent" (Wylie: thub pa dgongs gsal) and "Discriminating the Three Vows" (Wylie: sdom gsum rab dbye).

The main Dharma system of the Sakya school is the "Path with its Result" (Wylie: lam dang 'bras bu bcas), which is split into two main lineages, "Explanation for the Assembly" (Wylie: tshogs bshad) and the "Explanation for Close Disciples" (Wylie: slobs bshad).

The other major system of the Sakya school is the "Naropa Explanation For Disciples" (Wylie: nā ro mkha spyod slob bshad).

Another important series of teachings is based on verses of Günga Nyingpo (1092–1158) called "separating from the four attachments" which is the subject of commentaries by numerous Sakya masters like Drakpa Gyeltsen, Sakya Pandita, Ngorchen Günga Sangpo, and Gorampa Sönam Senggé. The verses are:

If you cling to this life, then you are not a dharma practitioner.

If you cling to existence, then you do not have renunciation.

If you are attached to your own interests, then you do not have the mind of awakening.

If you hold to a position, then you do not have the correct view.

== Subschools ==
In due course, two subsects emerged from the main Sakya lineage,

- Ngor, founded in Tsang by Ngorchen Kunga Zangpo (1382–1457). The Ngor school is centered on Ngor Evam Choden monastery. It represents 85% of the Sakyapa school and most if not all the monasteries in India are Ngorpa, apart from Sakya Trizin's monastery.
- Tshar, founded by Tsarchen Losal Gyamtso (1496 - 1560 or 1502–1556).

There were three "mother" monasteries of the Sakya school: Sakya Monastery, founded in 1073, Ngor Evam Choden, founded in 1429, and Phanyul Nalendra in Phanyul, north of Lhasa, founded in 1435 by Kuntchen Rongten. Nalendra became the home of the 'whispered-lineage' of the Tsar school.

The Bodongpa tradition, founded by Bodong Panchen Chögle Namgyel [1376 1451], is considered by some scholars to be a sub-sect of the Sakya tradition.

== Feudal lordship over Tibet ==
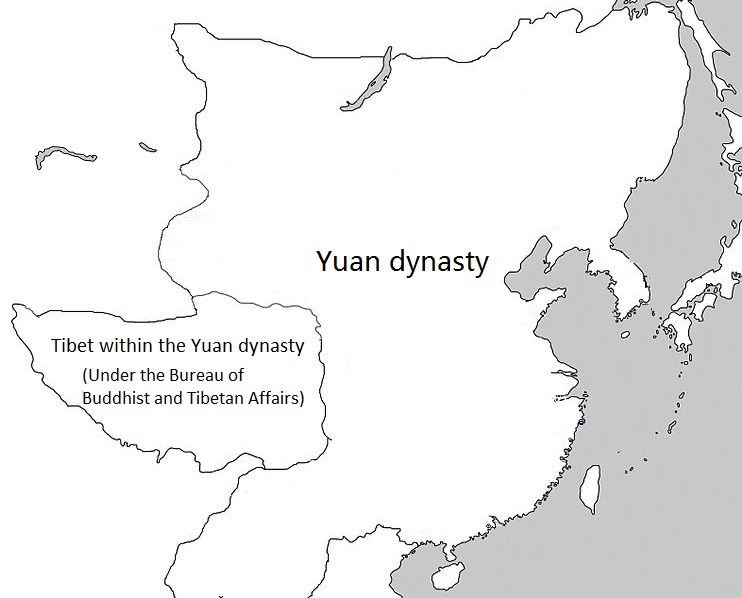
Tibet within the Yuan dynasty under the top-level department known as the Bureau of Buddhist and Tibetan Affairs (Xuanzheng Yuan).

The Mongol conquest of Tibet began after the foundation of the Mongol Empire in the early 13th century. In 1264, the feudal reign over Tibet was given to Drogön Chögyal Phagpa by Kublai Khan, founder of the Yuan dynasty. Sakya lamas, along with Sakya Imperial Preceptors and dpon-chens continued to serve as viceroys or administrators of Tibet on behalf of Yuan emperors for nearly 75 years after Phagpa's death in 1280, until the Yuan dynasty was greatly weakened by the Red Turban Rebellion in the 1350s, a decade before the Ming dynasty founded by the Han people overthrew the Yuan dynasty.

The leaders of the Sakya regime were as follows.

- Drogön Chögyal Phagpa 1253–1280
- Dharmapala Raksita 1280–1282, d. 1287
- Jamyang Rinchen Gyaltsen 1286–1303
- Zangpo Pal 1306–1323
- Khatsun Namkha Lekpa Gyaltsen 1325–1341
- Jamyang Donyo Gyaltsen 1341–1344
- Lama Dampa Sonam Gyaltsen 1344–1347
- Lotro Gyaltsen 1347–1365

== Sakya today ==
The head of the Sakya school, known as Sakya Trizin ("holder of the Sakya throne"), is always drawn from the male line of the Khön family. The present Sakya Trizin, Gyana Vajra is the forty-third to hold that office. 41st Sakya Trizin is thought to be the reincarnation of two great Tibetan masters: a Nyingmapa lama known as Apong Terton (Orgyen Thrinley Lingpa), who is famous for his Red Tara cycle, and his grandfather, the 39th Kyabgon Sakya Trizin Dhagtshul Thrinley Rinchen (1871–1936).

Traditionally, hereditary succession has alternated between the two Sakya palaces, since Khon Könchok Gyelpo's (1034–1102) reign. The Ducho sub-dynasty of Sakya survives split into two palaces, the Dolma Phodrang and Phuntsok Phodrang. Sakya Trizin is head of the Dolma Phodrang. Jigdal Dagchen Sakya (1929–2016) was the head of the Phuntsok Phodrang, and lived in Seattle, Washington, where he co-founded Sakya Monastery of Tibetan Buddhism with Dezhung Rinpoche III, and constructed the first Tibetan Buddhist Monastery in the United States. Dagchen Sakya's father was the previous Sakya Trizin, Trichen Ngawang Thutop Wangchuk, throne holder of Sakya, and his mother Dechen Drolma. Dagchen Sakya was married to Dagmo Jamyang Kusho Sakya; they have five sons, five grandchildren and three great-grandchildren.

== The Rimé movement ==
Having seen how the Gelug institutions pushed the other traditions into the corners of Tibet's cultural life, Jamyang Khyentse Wangpo and Jamgön Kongtrül compiled together the teachings of the Sakya, Kagyu and Nyingma, including many near-extinct teachings. Without Khyentse and Kongtrul's collecting and printing of rare works, the suppression of Buddhism by the Communists would have been much more final.

== See also ==
- Jonang
- Lamdré
- Patron and priest relationship
- Sakya Monastery
- Tibet under Yuan rule
- Tibetan Buddhism
