= Imperial Preceptor =

Title of monk officials in Tibetan Buddhism

The Imperial Preceptor, or Dishi (simplified Chinese: 帝师; traditional Chinese: 帝師; pinyin: Dìshī; lit. 'Teacher of the Emperor'; Middle Mongolian: guê šhi or gue šhi; Tibetan: གོང་མའི་སློབ་དཔོན, Wylie: gong mavi slob dpon), was a high title and powerful post in the Yuan dynasty. It was created by Kublai Khan as part of Mongol patronage of Tibetan Buddhism and the Yuan administrative rule of Tibet.

The title was originally created as the State Preceptor or Guoshi (simplified Chinese: 国师; traditional Chinese: 國師; pinyin: Guóshī; lit. 'Teacher of the State'; Middle Mongolian: di šhi or ti ši; Tibetan: གོ་ཤྲི, Wylie: go shri) in 1260, the first year of Kublai Khan's enthronement. In that year he appointed the Sakya lama Drogön Chögyal Phagpa to this post and soon placed him in charge of all Buddhist clergy. In 1264, he founded the Bureau of Buddhist and Tibetan Affairs and appointed Phagpa as the first director of this important new agency. The lama was offered nominal rule over all Tibet and also supervised Mongol relations with the Buddhist clergy. In 1270, Phagpa became Imperial Preceptor (Dishi) when the title was renamed. As Imperial Preceptor, he was authorized to issue letters and proclamations to the temples and institutions of Tibet, and he advised the emperor regarding official appointments in Tibet. Kublai Khan dispatched the lama to Tibet in 1264 to help persuade his people to accept Mongol rule.

A member of the Sakya sect, acting as Imperial Preceptor and residing in China, supervised the Buddhist clergy throughout the empire. The Mongols also selected a Tibetan official titled dpon-chen to live in and administer Tibet. This pattern of religio-political relations prevailed for the remainder of the Yuan period. After the overthrow of the Mongol-led Yuan dynasty by the Han-led Ming dynasty, Yuan titles such as Imperial Preceptor were revoked, replaced with titles of lesser status.

== Introduction of the Yuan dynasty and beginnings of the Imperial Preceptor ==
=== Pre-Yuan history ===
The Yuan dynasty (1271–1368) was founded by Kublai Khan. During the last century of the Song dynasty (960–1279), a new dynasty called the Western Xia came into existence in northwest China. The Western Xia was ruled by a Tibetan people, the Tanguts. The Tangut monarch Emperor Renzong of Western Xia (1139–1193) fought against the Mongols and other northern steppe tribes. He formed a close relationship with the Buddhist prelates and Tibetan priests, which led to the creation of the Xia/Hsia Institution of the Imperial Preceptorship. The role the Imperial Preceptor carried would later emerge in the Yuan dynasty and be largely influential to the Buddhist religion during Yuan rule.

=== Rise of the Yuan dynasty ===
Kublai Khan, leader of the Mongol Borjigin clan, established the Yuan dynasty eight years before he took over all of China. He proclaimed himself Emperor of China in 1271 and subsequently conquered the Song dynasty. Under Kublai Khan, the Yuan dynasty was structurally divided in a similar manner as the Mongol Empire. He also established his rule under the Mandate of Heaven (1272), a Chinese political and religious doctrine used to justify emperorship over China. This doctrine helped Kublai Khan establish his legitimate rule as he was considered to have the divine right to rule. Not only did he establish religious and political rule over China, he kept his ancestral roots as a Mongol leader by following Confucianism. Kublai Khan expanded the Chinese commercial, scientific, and cultural industries. He improved the Silk Road, created better infrastructure, circulated paper banknotes, and spread Mongol peace, leading to a prosperous and flourishing period.

=== The Influence of Buddhism on Yuan dynasty Tibet ===
The Buddhist influence on Yuan rule under Kublai Khan was heavily dependent on the Tibetan Buddhist Imperial Preceptors. In twelfth-century Asia, Western Xia Buddhism was vigorously promoted and there were religious scriptures translated to Chinese and Tangut in order to spread the religion. Use of these Buddhist scriptures continued even during the Mongol conquest for the Western Xia dynasty in 1227. By the mid-twelfth century onward shows a special relationship between the Western Xia throne and the Sangha that is distinct from the Song dynasty courts. Before the Yuan dynasty, the role of the Imperial Preceptor had already been established during the early rule of Renzong Emperor in 1139–1193. During the Yuan dynasty, the Imperial Preceptor's position was continued in response to overseeing the political situation in Central Tibet. The role of the Imperial Preceptor was to coordinate all of the Buddhist activities and establishments in the Yuan Empire and promoting Buddhism.

== Roles of the Imperial Preceptor ==
In the 12th century, under the Emperor Renzong of Western Xia, the role of the imperial preceptor was serving as the emperor's chaplain, teacher and consecrator and, more generally, teaching, writing, translating and editing. Later, under the Yuan dynasty, this post had also the added responsibility of overseeing the political situation in Central Tibet. Phagpa was a State Preceptor (guoshi) who eventually became Mongol Imperial Preceptor. The Mongol imperial preceptor resided within the precincts of the imperial palace in order to serve the imperial family. The role of the imperial preceptors was to issue decrees under the emperor's authority to both protect and command monasteries in Tibet. At some point, the imperial preceptor's decrees began to be equally effective as the emperor's in Tibet, as the Yuan court had begun tending to leave Tibet politically under the supervision of the imperial preceptor. He also advised the emperor regarding official appointments in Tibet. Moreover, being members of the Sakya sect, they directed all Buddhist establishments in the Yuan empire and were charged with promoting Buddhism in the empire. They also oversaw routine Buddhist ceremonies and special rituals upon the enthronement and funerals of the emperors. They held rituals and dedicated stupas to the protection of the state and its subjects, in general terms or in specific instances, such as to prevent flooding or thunderstorms. Nevertheless, the roles of the dishi focused on religious matters rather than political ones.

== Imperial Preceptors in the Yuan dynasty ==
=== Drogon Chogyal Phagpa (1235–1280) ===
Drogon Chogyal Phagpa was born in 1235 as the son of Sönam Gyeltsen, in Ngari (West Tibet). Phagpa was the first Imperial Preceptor of Kublai Khan's Yuan dynasty, division of the Mongol Empire, and was simultaneously named the director of the Bureau of Buddhist and Tibetan Affairs. He was the fifth leader of the Sakya school of Tibetan Buddhism. The Mongol ruler Kublai Khan ordered Phagpa to create a new writing system, for which he received a title of Imperial Preceptor (Dishi) in 1270. To design the script, Chogyal Phagpa made modifications to the Tibetan alphabet and made the Phags-pa script. The scripts was completed in 1268. Although the script was made into the official writing system of the empire there was a lot of opposition by the people and not many texts were written in that script. Although due to his important political role, he was to always stay close to the emperor and had a supreme authority over the Bureau of Buddhist and Tibetan Affairs, he apparently did not meet with the emperor that often and mostly lived in Lintao in Gansu. He gave up his position and passed it on to his brother (Rinchen Gyaltsen – the second preceptor of the Yuan dynasty) in 1274.

In his last years, Phagpa spent his time trying to build up the power of the Sakya-Yuan, in Tibet. He died in Sakya (the Lhakhang palace) on 15 December 1280. There were rumours that his death was a murder by Kunga Zangpo, who was a past pönchen (whom Phagpa had dismissed for an arrogant demeanor). Kunga Zangpo was then executed by the army.

=== Rinchen Gyaltsen (1238–1279 or 1282) ===
Rinchen Gyaltsen was born in 1238 as the son of Zangtsa Sonam Gyaltsen. He was the second preceptor of the Yuan dynasty. Rinchen Gyaltsen's family members were very important members in the Mongol government. His older half-brother had the title of the Dishi (Imperial Perceptor) and had a close relation with the emperor. His other brother (Chakna Dorje) was the viceroy of Tibet from the period 1264 to 1267. Also, Rinchen Gyaltsen's father belonged to the Khon family who were hereditary rulers of the Sakya monastery in Western Tibet.

When Rinchen Gyaltsen's older half-brother (Phagpa – the first preceptor of the Yuan dynasty) left Sakya, he became the “somewhat” abbot of the monastery of Sakya. Although his brother Phagpa was given the title of the Imperial Preceptor, he gave up the post in 1274 (to return to Sakya) and it was passed on to Rinchen Gyaltsen.

The year of the death of Rinchen Gyaltsen seems to be uncertain. It is said to be either 1279 or 1282 (most probably 12 March 1279). His death occurred in Shingkun (Lintao) and his post was passed on to his nephew and a son of Chakna Dorje (Dharmapala Raksita – the third preceptor of the Yuan dynasty).

=== Dharmapala Raksita (1269–1287) ===
Dharmapala Raksita was born after the death of his father (Chakna Dojre – brother Phagpa), in 1268. In addition to the title of the Imperial Preceptor, he was also the head of the Sakya School. Since birth, because he was born fatherless, his care was assigned to the lord of Zhalu. At the age of 14 in 1892, he succeeded his uncles title and was appointed as Dishi (imperial preceptor). Although he was given the title, he did not have much experience and knowledge about the position and he never became the abbot. After receiving the title he stayed close to the great Khan. During his period of being Dishi, he mostly participated in building activities. He had a stupa built in the memory of Phagpa (the first imperial preceptor). Also, he built the Metog Raba which then became an official residence for the imperial preceptors until the end of the Yuan dynasty. Dharmapala married two women, Palden, a granddaughter of Köden, and to Jowo Tagibum, a lady from Zhalu. He had a son with the latter, who died at the age of 5, this is why his part of the Khon family died out and the next Dishi or Sakya abbot were not part of the Khon lineage.

Dharmapala gave up his position as the imperial preceptor in 1286 and left the court to visit Sakya and Tibet. However, he died before getting there on 24 December 1287, at Tre Mandala.

=== Yeshe Rinchen (1248–1294) ===
Yeshe Rinchen was born in 1248 as the son of Chukpo Jetsun Kya and was from Sakya in Tibet. Unlike the first three imperial preceptors of the Yuan dynasty, Yeshe Rinchen was not from the Khon lineage. Yeshe Rinchen was from the Sharpa lineage. There were three divisions within the disciples of the abbots, Sakya Pandita and Phagpa. The three disciples were eastern (Shar), western (Nub) and middle (Gun). The Shar (eastern) was headed by a family of Zhangzhung origins, known as Sharpa. When he was younger, Yeshe Rinchen was a follower of Phagpa. The Dishi before Yeshe Rinchen was Dharmapala Raksita and because he had no heirs to succeed his position at the time he vacated his position as Dishi, the position was handed to the Sharpa family and Yeshe Rinchen was appointed imperial preceptor. At the same time, Yeshe Rinchen's brother Jamyang Rinchen Gyaltsen became the ruling abbot of Sakya. There is a possibility that the Sharpa brothers were both guided and supported by an older and more experienced or influential person (imperial minister Sangge). However, Sangge fell from power and was executed in 1291, which presumably made Yeshe Rinchen's position, difficult to protect. After this, Yeshe Rinchen vacated his position as Dishi in the same year. His position was succeeded by Drakpa Odzer. After stepping down from his position as Dishi, Yeshe Rinchen retired to the sacred Buddhist site Mount Wutai in present-day Shanxi. He died there in 1294.

=== Drakpa Odzer (1246–1303) ===
Drakpa Odzer was born in 1246 as the son of Sumpa Drakpa Gyaltsen, he was from Sakya in Tibet. Up to 1286 the position of the imperial preceptor was filled by members of the Khon family who were also usually hereditary abbots of Sakya. However, due to the lack of fully ordained members of the lineage after the death of the third preceptor (Dharmapala Raksita), persons from other clerical elite families of Sakya origins were appointed. Drakpa Odzer was from one of those clerical elite families called Khangsarpa. Drakpa Odzer was the general administrator in charge of Phagpa's property. After which he followed Phagpa's nephew Dharmapala Raksita when he moved to Beijing to take up the Dishi dignity in 1282. Drakpa Odzer was appointed as the Dishi after Yeshe Rinchen (the Dishi after Dharmapala Raksita) vacated his position as Dishi. He held the post from 1291 until he died at the imperial court in 1303. He was succeeded by the ex-abbot Jamyang Rinchen Gyaltsen. After Jamyang Rinchen Gyaltsen, his younger brother Sanggye Pal became Dishi, in 1309.

=== Jamyang Rinchen Gyaltsen (1257–1305) ===
Jamyang Rinchen Gyaltsen was born as the son of Chukpo Jetsun Kyab in 1257, he was from Sakya in Tibet. Jamyang Rinchen Gyaltsen was the brother of Yeshe Rinchen, they both had another brother called Kunga Senge.

There were three divisions within the disciples of the abbots, Sakya Pandita and Phagpa. The three disciples were; eastern (Shar), western (Nub) and middle (Gun). The Shar (eastern) was headed by a family of Zhangzhung origins, known as Sharpa. Just as Yeshe Rinchen, Jamyan Rinchen Gyaltsen also belonged to the Sharpa family. After the young Sakya Dishi Dharmapala Raksita vacated his position in 1286 and died in 1287, Khagan Kublai Khan suspended the influence of the Khön family. Instead the Shar or Sharpa family came to the fore. This was possibly due to their good relations with the influential Yuan minister Sangge. Yeshe Rinchen was appointed Dishi by orders of Kublai Khan, while his youngest brother Jamyang Rinchen Gyeltsen became the acting abbot (Wylie: bla chos) of the Sakya school. The appointments gave the Sharpa brothers influence in Tibet.

At the time when Jamyang Rinchen Gyaltsen was the ruler of the Sakya school of Tibetan Buddhism, After the death of Kublai Khan in 1294 the dpon-chen Aglen suggested that a scion of the old Khön family should be allowed to rule Sakya instead of Jamyang Rinchen Gyaltsen. This would be Zangpo Pal, a nephew of Phagpa, who presently stayed in South China. As a matter of fact the new great khan Temür acknowledged Zangpo Pal as the right heir and let him return to Sakya in 1298. Jamyang Rinchen Gyaltsen nominally handed over the abbot-ship, but continued to direct Sakya affairs from the official abbot's palace Zhitog. Later in 1303, he was summoned to Beijing by the great khan. Being a loyal and experienced man, he was ordered to take up the position of Dishi after the death of the former title-holder. However, he died in 1305, and the position was succeeded by Drakpa Odzer's younger brother Sanggye Pal.

=== Sanggye Pal (1267–1314) ===
Sanggye Pal was born in 1267 as the son of Sumpa Drakpa Gyaltsen, he was from Sakya in Tibet. He was the younger brother of Drakpa Odzer, who was the fifth Dishi of the Yuan dynasty. Sanggye Pal belonged to the Khangsarpa family (a clerical elite family of Sakya origins). According to the Yuan shi (History of the Yuan Dynasty), the old Dishi Jamyang Rinchen Gyaltsen (d. 1305) was followed first by a Duoerjibale (Dorje Pal) in 1305–13, and then Sangjiayizhashi (Sanggye Tashi) in 1313–14. However, a document sent to the Tibetan myriarchy Zhalu in 1307 is issued by Sanggye Pal. Therefore, there is a possibility that Sanggye Pal took over the Dishi dignity in 1305 and kept it until 1314, and that he was also known as Dorje Pal.

There is not much documentation on Sanggye Pal and not much is known of his activities. In the period of his position as the Dishi, Tibet was relatively stable under the administration of the Yuan dynasty.

=== Kunga Lotro Gyaltsen (1299–1327) ===
Kunga Lotro Gyaltsen, born in 1299 and deceased in 1327, was the eighth Tibetan Imperial Preceptor of the Yuan dynasty. He came from a very prominent aristocratic family called the Khon of Sakya. His father, Zangpo Pal, is the ruler of a monastery while his mother, Jomo Kunga Bumphulwa, was a widow of a Tibetan administrator. He served under the title of the Imperial Preceptor from 1314 until his death. As the Preceptor Kunga Lotro Gyaltsen has mass influence over the department of Buddhist affairs. For example, he once wrote a letter and started the letter by saying: “By the king's order, the words of Kunga Lotro Gyaltsen Palzangpo, Imperial Preceptor: To the officials of Pacification Commissioner rank, to generals, soldiers, administrators of the nang so, to judges, holders of golden letters, chiefs of districts, laymen and monks who collect taxes and go and come, to myriarchs, to dignitaries, a command.” This shows how much power and authority he commanded during his year as the Imperial Preceptor. In 1326, Kunga Lotro Gyaltsen decided to return to Tibet from the Imperial Capital due to health declination. However, he never actually went back, because his homeland was unsafe at that time due to a rebellion. Eventually, he stayed in the Yuan capital until his death (March 6, 1327).

=== Wangchug Gyeltshen (? – 1323 or 1325) ===
There is neither records of Wangchug Gyeltshen's year of birth nor that of his family background. Even the year of his death has proven to be very controversial. For example, according to the Yuanshi (also known as The History Of Yuan), Wangchug Gyeltshen deceased in 1323, while on the other hand, according to another unknown source, he died in 1325. Another controversial debate around Wangchug Gyeltshen is whether he had actually been assigned as the Imperial Preceptor or not. The reason for this controversy is that he actually died earlier than the last Preceptor, Kunga Lotro Gyaltsen, who deceased in 1327. This seemed like a rather odd situation because Preceptors usually continue their role until their death. As a result, some scholars tend to believe that even if Wangchug Gyeltshen had been appointed as the Preceptor, he was merely a temporary substitute for Kunga Lotro Gyaltsen when he was away in Tibet and not around the Yuan capital.

=== Kunga Lekpa Jungne Gyaltsen (1308–1330) ===
Kunga Lekpa Jungne Gyaltsen was born in 1308 and died in 1330. He was the younger brother of the eighth Imperial Preceptor, Kunga Lotro Gyaltsen. When Kunga Lotro Gyaltsen was the Imperial Preceptor, he divided up his siblings into four different groups, each of which lived in a different palace (Zhitog, Lhakhang, Rinchengang, and Ducho). And Kunga Lekpa Jungne Gyaltsen lived in the Lhakhang. About two months after his brother's death in 1327, Kunga Lekpa Jungne Gyaltsen got appointed by emperor Yesün Temür as the new Imperial Preceptor. However, he only arrived in the Yuan Capital a year after his appointment. Like his brother, he worked as the Imperial Preceptor until he died. Nevertheless, multiple sources show controversies over his year of death. However, according to the most reliable one, Kunga Lekpa Jungne Gyaltsen died in 1330. A common practice among his family was to get married and have kids before fully turning into a monk; Kunga Lekpa Jungne Gyaltsen showed no difference. He had five children and one of them, Sonam Lotro, eventually became the thirteenth Imperial Preceptor, while another, Drakpa Gyaltsen, also became a very powerful government official in Tibet.

=== Rinchen Trashi (? – ?) ===
Rinchen Trashi's family background, year of birth and death are all unknown. Furthermore, this is the last Preceptor that was recorded in the Yuanshi (also known as The History Of Yuan). On the other hand, no records of him in the Tibetan language can be found. According to a very limited Wikipedia page in the Chinese Language, Rinchen Trashi was appointed by Jayaatu Khan Tugh Temür, the 12th Khagan of the Mongol empire, as the Imperial Preceptor in 1329.

=== Kunga Gyaltsen (1310–1358) ===
Kunga Gyaltsen was born in 1310 and died in 1358. He was the twelfth Imperial Preceptor of the Mongol Yuan dynasty. Like many other previous Imperial Preceptors, Kunga Gyaltsen belonged to the Khon family, a group of monastery leaders with fairly high political authority in certain regions of Tibet. Kunga Gyaltsen served under this title from 1331 to his death, making him a raw exception that held the title for a very long period of time. Also, he was the last Imperial Preceptor before the coming of the Phagmodrupa dynasty in Tibet. During his early career as the Imperial Preceptor, Kunga Gyaltsen's authority and power were recognized and respected in Tibet. He came up with several new religious rules and people followed them with respect. The appointment of his son, Lotro Gyaltsen, as a monastery leader in the year 1347 further strengthened his place. However, his stay in Dadu during the Tibertan civil war period meant that he could not really do anything significant to help, despite having so much authority as the Imperial Preceptor. Eventually, when the Phagmodrus took over, the leader of this dynasty severely weakened the authorities of the Sakyas (the group which Kunga Gyaltsen and many other previous Imperial Preceptors belonged in). In 1358, the leader of the Phagmodrupas, Changchub Gyaltsen, arranged a meeting in which he officially claimed rule over Central Tibet under the regime of Phagmodrupa. Kunga Gyaltsen died the same year and there were not any appointments of a new successor for 3 years until his nephew, Sonam Lotro Gyaltsen, eventually replaced him in 1361.

=== Sonam Lotro Gyaltsen (1332–1362) ===
Sonam Lotro Gyaltsen was born in 1332 and deceased in 1362. No information about him can be found in any records in the Chinese language. According to records of Tibetan history published in 2005 by the official Chinese government, this Imperial Preceptor came from one of the six ancient aristocratic families in Tibet. His aristocratic background, in particular, was located in Sa’gya, a county in the city of Shigatse. His father is the 10th Imperial Preceptor of the Yuan dynasty, Kunga Lekpa Jungne Gyaltsen, while his mother also came from an aristocratic family of the Ü-Tsang region, one of the three traditional provinces of Tibet. Sonam Lotro Gyaltsen replaced his uncle, Kunga Gyaltsen, as the Imperial Preceptor. However, he served under this title for only a year, from 1361 until his eventual death in 1362.

=== Namgyel Pel Sangpo ===
There are little to no records of Namgyel Pel Sangpo.

== The end of the Imperial Preceptor ==
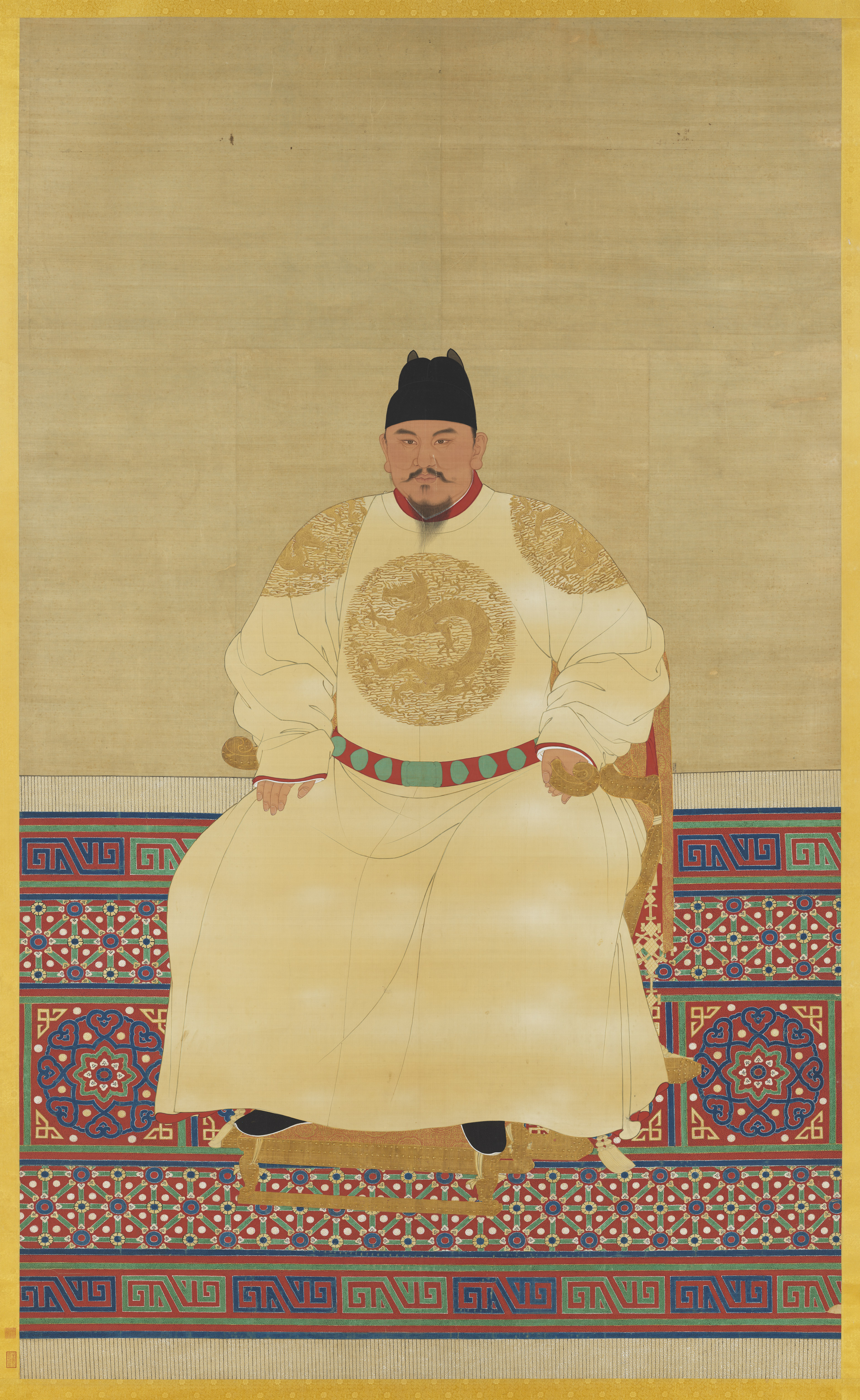
Zhu Yuanzhang (the Hongwu Emperor)

The Yuan dynasty ended in 1368, after the armies of the Ming dynasty captured the capital city, Khanbaliq (modern-day Beijing). This followed decades of struggle for the Yuan dynasty, including natural disasters, like flooding and droughts, and the Red Turban Rebellion (1351).

Due to the weakening of the government and the Yuan Emperor's (Emperor Huizong) reliance on local warlords' armies, Emperor Huizong eventually fled North to the city of Shangdu, leaving the capital open to be captured by the Ming armies.

At the capture of Khanbaliq in 1368, the Ming dynasty was founded by Zhu Yuanzhang, also called the Hongwu Emperor. As the Yuan dynasty was founded by Mongols, the Hongwu Emperor passed many edicts that were intended to purify China of their influence while also forbidding many Mongol practices.

The Hongwu Emperor changed the basic structure of the government. The system was used by the Qing dynasty after them, lasting up until 1911/12. One of the changes that was made was the revoking of the Imperial Preceptor title. When Zhu came to power and the Ming dynasty was established, the role of the Imperial Preceptor was abolished, and their responsibilities and roles were divided. Titles of lesser importance were created, and the people that carried these new titles were given the Imperial Preceptor's previous responsibilities. However, these new titles were granted to very few people, mainly due to political reasons.

During the reign of the second emperor of the Ming dynasty, the Yongle Emperor, ties with Tibet were strengthened, especially through religious teachings. The Yongle Emperor hosted many Tibetan teachers with the most famous and highest regarded being Dezhin Shekpa. Shekpa was the only one to be recognised as the emperor's personal preceptor. Because of this, Shekpa was granted a lengthy title often shortened to Rúlái dàbǎo fǎwáng (如來大寶法王), meaning "Tathāgata Great Precious Dharma King". The highest title to be granted to a Tibetan teacher during the Ming period, it was the equivalent of being granted the title of Imperial Preceptor.

However, the term Dìshī (帝師; lit. "teacher of the emperor") may also be used to refer to the office certain post-Yuan dynasty officials.

== See also ==
- Bureau of Buddhist and Tibetan Affairs
- List of rulers of Tibet
- Patron and priest relationship
- Sakya
- Tibet under Yuan rule, also known as the Sakya dynasty
