= Tibet under Yuan rule =

Time period in Tibet from 1270-1350

- c. 1270–1354
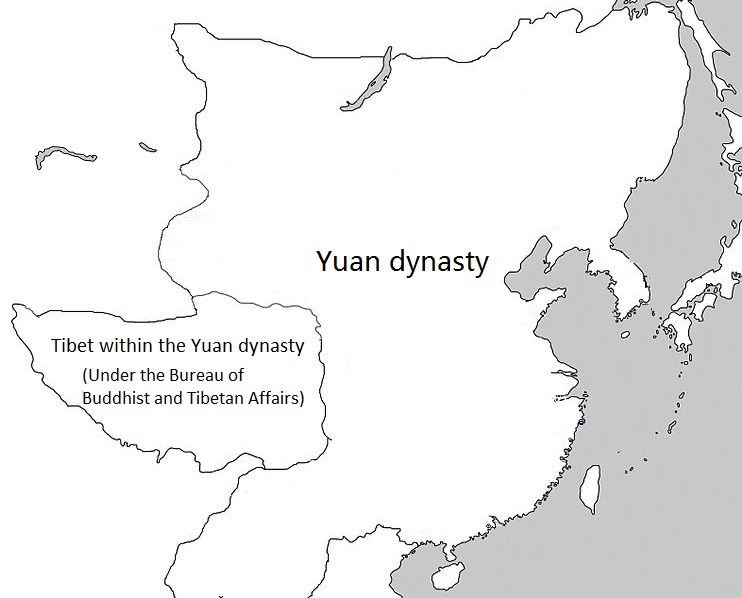
- Tibet within the Yuan dynasty
- Capital: Drigung Gompa (1240–1264); Sakya Monastery (1268–1354)
- Government: Shakya Lama theocracy Administrated under the Bureau of Buddhist and Tibetan Affairs
- History
  - Established: c. 1270
  - Disestablished: 1354
Preceded by	Succeeded by
Mongol Empire	Phagmodrupa dynasty

Tibet under Yuan rule refers to the Mongol-led Yuan dynasty's rule over Tibet from approximately 1270 to 1354. During the Yuan dynasty, Tibet was administered by an organization that was structurally, militarily and administratively subordinate to the Yuan court. (Note: Scholars argue whether administrative control extended to complete political control, whether the Yuan dynasty directly ruled Tibet, and how separate Yuan rule of Tibet was from Yuan rule of the rest of China. However, it is accepted that the Yuan dynasty had administrative control over the region.) Tibet was conquered by the Mongols led by a general titled doord darkhan in 1240 and Mongol rule was established after Sakya Pandita obtained power over Tibet through the Mongols in 1244. This period and administration has been called the Sakya dynasty (Tibetan: ས་སྐྱ་, Wylie: sa skya, Chinese: 薩迦王朝; pinyin: Sàjiā Wángcháo) after the favored Sakya school of Tibetan Buddhism.

The region retained a degree of political autonomy under the Sakya lama, who was the de jure head of Tibet and a spiritual leader of the Mongol Empire under the priest and patron relationship. However, administrative and military rule of Tibet remained under the auspices of the Yuan government agency known as the Bureau of Buddhist and Tibetan Affairs (Xuanzheng Yuan), a top-level administrative department separate from other Yuan provinces, but still under the administration of the Yuan dynasty. Tibet retained nominal power over religious and political affairs, while the Yuan dynasty managed a structural and administrative rule over the region, reinforced by the rare military intervention. This existed as a "diarchic structure" under the Yuan emperor, with power primarily in favor of the Mongols. One of the department's purposes was to select a dpon-chen, the de facto administrator and imperial representative in Tibet, usually appointed by the lama and confirmed by the Yuan emperor in Dadu (modern-day Beijing).

== Terminology ==
In the Yuan dynasty, the most commonly used named for Tibet and Tibetans were Tufan, Xifan, and Wuzang/Wusizang. Tufan is derived from Böd, the native Tibetan name for Tibet. Xifan (Western Böd) is a Sino-Tibetan term and Wuzang/Wusizang are Chinese transliterations of Ü-Tsang, which in Yuan and Ming times referred to Central Tibet. According to Tibetan sources, the center of Ü was Lhasa and Tsang's center was Shigatse. Other Yuan dynasty Chinese renderings of Tibetan terms include Tuosima (Amdo) and Tuogansi (Kham). Tibetan monks were called Xiseng (Western Monks), a term used to collectively describe Tibetan, Nepali, Indian, and Tangut monks.

== History ==
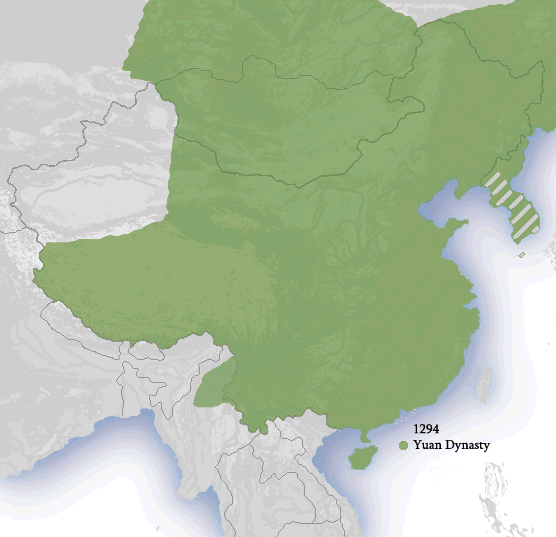
Yuan dynasty c. 1294

=== Conquest of Tibet ===
Tibet was invaded by the Mongol Empire in 1240 and 1244. The first invasion was by Prince Köden or Godan, grandson of Genghis Khan and son of Ögedei Khan. The second invasion by Möngke Khan resulted in the entire region falling under Mongol rule. Kublai Khan incorporated the region into his later Yuan dynasty, but left the legal system intact. Drogön Chögyal Phagpa, the Sakya lama, became a religious teacher to Kublai, who made him the nominal head of the region.

=== Administration ===
Tibetans who reached positions of power under the Yuan dynasty were all invariably religious figures. When Tibetan tribal chieftains are mentioned in the History of Yuan, they are not described as part of the permanent and direct government of the Yuan dynasty. The Mongols set up administrative units in Tibet starting from the 1260s: in 1264 the Mongols created Anxi Prefecture out of 18 Tibetan clans, in 1268 Anxi Prefecture was subordinated to Tuosima Route (Amdo), in 1269 the Pacification Office and General Military Command for Tibet and Other Places was subordinated to the Branch Secretariat for Shaanxi and later the Bureau of Buddhist and Tibetan Affairs (Xuanzheng Yuan). Other administrative structures were known by the History, but the editors note that they lacked the information on these structures. The Da Ming Yi Tong Zhi says that Kublai set up lower tiers of local government in Tibet that were under the overall authority of the Imperial Preceptor Phagpa.

==== Military ====
The majority of Yuan offices in Tibet were military posts. Tuosima (Amdo) and Tuogansi (Kham) were organized into Routes/Circuits. Postal stations were created in these regions and Wuzang (Ü-Tsang). These offices were held by local and regional commanders who were loosely supervised and directed by members of the Yuan imperial clan. Kublai's offspring were given Tibet as part of their dominion. According to Rashid al-Din Hamadani, Kublai gave Tibet to his son Aurughchi. Chinese sources state that Kublai's third son Mangghala ruled over Tibet, Hexi, and Sichuan. Rashid says that Mangghala's son Ananda was given the lands of the Tangut which correspond to Hexi and the Tibetan borderland.

The Mongols used military force to rule Tibet when their Tibetan intermediaries were insufficient. In 1268, an expedition led by Manggudai was sent to put down a rebellion in Tibet and Jiandu (modern Xichang). Another campaign was undertaken in 1275 by Prince Aurughchi in Tibet. By 1280, Mongol rule over Tibet was secure enough for Kublai to organize expeditions to be sent in search for the source of the Yellow River. Despite the military campaigns and administrative structures set up in Tibet, the Mongols never gained uncontested control over Tibet. As late as 1347, Tibetans attacked a caravan transporting wine from Gaochang to the capital. In 1354, members of the Yuan imperial clan were being instructed to lead a punitive expedition against Tibetan bandits in Hexi. The Basic Annals (Benji) contain numerous mentions of rebellions by Tibetan tribes, attacks on Mongol garrisons, and punitive campaigns.

Tibet was often a place of refuge or exile for individuals in the Yuan dynasty. A certain Zhang Lidao got into trouble in Yunnan and fled to Tibet. In 1336, a former official of Henan was exiled to Tibet and became a monk. Emperor Gong of Song was sent to Tibet in 1288 and became a monk in 1296. In 1322 he was ordered to commit suicide.

==== Sakya rule ====
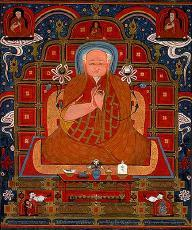
Drogön Chögyal Phagpa, the first Imperial Preceptor of the Yuan dynasty

The religious institution of Tibet under the Yuan dynasty traces back to a letter written by Godan, the son of Ögedei Khan, to the Sakya sect's Sakya Pandita Kunga Gyeltsen in 1244. Godan invited Sakya Pandita to visit him. One possible reason why the Sakya lama was chosen over other Buddhist sects is because they specialized in magic rituals and in spreading Buddhist morality. Sakya Pandita died in 1251 and Godan died soon after as well.

Sakya Pandita was succeeded by his nephew Phagpa. Phagpa was invited to meet Kublai in 1253 and helped him and his lineage develop a theory of theocratic rule, incorporating the Kublaids into a line of Buddhist universal rulers. Under Phagpa's influence, Genghis Khan's birth was interpreted as an event that heralded the salvation of the world according to the teachings of the Buddha. Chinese, Tibetan, and Mongol sources all agree that Kublai was given a consecration in 1253 and initiated to the rites of Hevajra, who was given special prominence by the Sakya monasteries. The rites of Hevajra and Mahakala became customary for the enthronement of every yuan emperor and Mahakala became the national protector deity of the Mongols.

In 1260, Kublai appointed Phagpa as "Guoshi", or State Preceptor. The title was later changed to Imperial Precetor (Dishi). Phagpa was the first "to initiate the political theology of the relationship between state and religion in the Tibeto-Mongolian Buddhist world". Khublai established a system in which a Sakya lama would be Imperial Preceptor, who would reside in China and supervise all the Buddhists of the empire, and a Tibetan called dpon-chen (Ponchen) or "Civil Administrator" would live in Tibet to administer it. This system also led to conflicts between the Sakya leaders and the dpon-chens.

Phagpa expounded on a theory for ruling the world defined by "two orders", one order based on the religious and one order based on the secular. He embodied the Buddha whereas the Yuan emperor embodied the chakravartin universal ruler, each presiding over their domains of religion and secular state rule. Although this was never fully implemented in either the Yuan dynasty or later Mongol states, Phagpa's family did marry into the Yuan imperial clan. His younger brother married princess Megalung in 1265 and a son was born to them in 1268, and the son later married a daughter of Jibig Temur, the third son of Godan. Phagpa and other lamas occupied the role of something similar to court chaplains to the Yuan emperors. The lamas were also quite influential in Ilkhanate.

Phagpa was honored by the Yuan state after his death in 1280. He was given a posthumous title, a stupa was built for him in 1282, and memorial halls, clay statues, and paintings were created for him in the 1320s. Phagpa's position as Imperial Preceptor was succeeded by Tibetan lamas, most of whom were his close relatives.

==== Bureau of Buddhist and Tibetan Affairs ====
The Bureau of Buddhist and Tibetan Affairs, (Note: The name used by historians. It is also sometimes referred to as a "Commission" or an "Office" for Buddhist and Tibetan Affairs.) or Xuanzheng Yuan (Note: Alternatively rendered as Hsüan-cheng Yüan.) (Chinese: 宣政院; pinyin: Xuānzhèng Yuàn; lit. 'Court for the Spread of Governance') was a government agency of the Mongol-led Yuan dynasty of China to handle Buddhist affairs across the empire in addition to managing Tibet. It was originally set up by Kublai Khan in 1264 under the name Zongzhi Yuan (Note: Alternative spellings include Tsung-chih yüan.) (simplified Chinese: 总制院; traditional Chinese: 總制院; pinyin: Zǒngzhìyuàn) or the "Bureau of General Regulation", before it was renamed in 1288. The name was chosen because during the Tang dynasty, the Tibetans were received in the Xuanzheng Hall. The History of Yuan gives a straightforward description of its functions: "It handled Buddhist monks as well as the territory of Tufan (i.e. Tibet) and they were under its jurisdiction and governed by it". The deputy director of the bureau was always a Buddhist monk.

The bureau was set up in Khanbaliq (modern Beijing) and was named after the Xuanzheng Hall where Tibetan envoys were received in the Tang dynasty. In the Yuan dynasty, Tibet was managed by the Bureau of Buddhist and Tibetan Affairs, separate from the other Yuan provinces such as those established in the former territories of the Song dynasty. While no modern equivalents remain, the political functions of the Bureau of Buddhist and Tibetan Affairs might have been analogous to the India Office in London during the British Raj. Besides holding the title of Imperial Preceptor or Dishi, Drogön Chögyal Phagpa, the fifth leader of the Sakya school of Tibetan Buddhism, was concurrently named the director of the Bureau of Buddhist and Tibetan Affairs.

One of the department's purposes was to select a dpon-chen ('great administrator', a civilian administrator who governed Tibet when Sakya Lama was away), usually appointed by the lama and confirmed by the Yuan emperor in Beijing. The lamas like the Imperial Preceptors were given Chinese noble titles and the regents of the Sakya monastery ruled by imperial command through seals given to them by the Mongol emperors. Tibet was ruled by lamas sanctioned by the imperial court through the bureau. However these positions were hereditary and the granting of Chinese noble titles was only a formality. The Yuan emperor did little or nothing to interfere with their rule. The bureau was staffed by only Tibetans and Mongols.

Tibetan Buddhism was not only practiced within the capital Beijing but throughout the country. Apart from Tibetan affairs, the Bureau of Buddhist and Tibetan Affairs managed the entire Buddhist clergy throughout the realm (whether they were Han, Tibetan or Korean etc.), and supervised all temples, monasteries, and other Buddhist properties in the empire, at least in name. According to scholar Evelyn Rawski, it supervised 360 Buddhist monasteries. To emphasize its importance for Hangzhou, capital of the former Southern Song dynasty and the largest city in the Yuan realm, a branch (行, Xing, "acting") Xuanzheng Yuan was established in that city in 1291. In public and official meetings, Tibetan Buddhism was practiced alongside Han Buddhism.

Sometimes these bureau offices were created in order to deal with emergencies such as in 1357 when a bureau branch was established to counteract Tibetan brigands. A joint punitive expedition was organized by both the Bureau of Buddhist and Tibetan Affairs and the Bureau of Military Affairs in 1311. In the same year an imperial decree clarified that the bureau had the authority to oversee military affairs in Tibet as well as the management of postal stations.

There was another Buddhist Affairs Commission that existed by 1280 when a supervisor was installed to report on Buddhist monks and Tibetan affairs. This commission's role was limited to the supervision of Buddhist rituals. Its personnel was cut in 1294 and the commission was abolished in 1329 with its responsibilities were taken over by the bureau.

The Lifan Yuan (also known as the Board for the Administration of Outlying Regions and Office of Mongolian and Tibetan Affairs etc.) was roughly a Qing dynasty equivalent of the Xuanzheng Yuan, instituted by the Qing Empire for administering affairs in Tibet and other border regions.

==== Imperial Preceptor ====
The Imperial Preceptor was a political office originally created in 1260 as State Preceptor (Guoshi) by Kublai for Drogön Chögyal Phagpa and later changed to Imperial Preceptor (Dishi) in late 1269. Throughout its existence, there were nine holders of the title of Imperial Preceptor, all of whom were from the Sakya school of Tibetan Buddhism, and five were from the Khön clan of Sakya. The Imperial Preceptor stayed at Khanbaliq (Beijing), the Yuan capital, and resided within the imperial palace at the Me-tog ra-ba monastery. The Imperial Preceptor was one of the leading figures at the Bureau of Buddhist and Tibetan Affairs and exerted immense influence on its leadership. He acted on behalf of the emperor in Tibet and issued orders in his name. After Phagpa, the position of abbot of the Sakya and Imperial Preceptor were separated. All of the Imperial Preceptors were appointed at a young age, which suggests that these appointments were mainly political in nature rather than owing to their maturity and gravitas.

- 'Drogön Chögyal Phagpa 1270-1274
- Rinchen Gyaltsen 1274-1282
- Dharmapala Raksita 1282-1286
- Yeshe Rinchen 1286-1291
- Drakpa Odzer 1291-1303
- Jamyang Rinchen Gyaltsen 1304-1305
- Sanggye Pal 1305-1314
- Kunga Lotro Gyaltsen 1314-1327
- Kunga Lekpa Jungne Gyaltsen 1328-1330
- Rinchen Trashi 1329-1330
- Kunga Gyaltsen 1331-1358
- Sonam Lotro Gyaltsen 1361-1362

==== Dpon-chen ====
The position of the dpon-chen, the temporal administrator of Tibet during the Yuan dynasty, traces back to 1244 when Sakya Pandita left the administrative duties and the supervision of monks to Sakya-bzan-po. The unprecedented length of his absence gave the administrator greater weight and importance, which remained true into the Yuan dynasty. According to Tibetan sources, the dpon-chen governed by the order of the Lama and the mandate of the emperor. He was probably chosen by the emperor and inducted through the Bureau of Buddhist and Tibetan Affairs by the Imperial Preceptor. His responsibilities were to keep the peace in Tibet and protect their religion. In practice, the dpon-chen managed the estates of the Sakya monastery and acted as an imperial official outside those confines, making him the de facto head of Tibet during the Yuan dynasty. This included administering the three circuits set up as Mongol princely appanages. In 1292, the dpon-chen was given the title of "[member of] the Pacification Bureau and Office of the regional commander established in the three circuits". In the 14th century, the dpon-chen performed a term of duty in the Bureau of Buddhist and Tibetan Affairs before he took up his appointment. There was also a Sakya council that came into being at the end of the Yuan era as the Khön family split into four branches and the Imperial Preceptor's powers waned, but it is uncertain what their relationship to the dpon-chen was. They derived their power from the abbot and were able to make high level appointments.

- Sakya-bzan-po 1260-170
- Kun-dga'-bzan-po 1270-1275
- Zan-btsun 1275-?
- P'yug-po sGan-dkar-ba ?-1280
- Byan-c'ub-rin-c'en 1281-1282
- Kun-dga'-gzon-nu 1282-?
- gZon-nu-dban-p'yug ?-1288
- Byan-c'ub-rdo-rje 1289
- Ag-len rDo-rje-pal 1290-1298
- gZon-nu-dban-p'yug (2nd time) 1298
- Legs-pa-dpal 1298-1305
- Sen-ge-dpal ?
- 'Od-zer-sen-ge 1315-1317
- Kun-dga'-rin-c'en ?
- Don-yod-dpal ?
- Yon-btsun Grags-pa-dar ?
- 'Od-zer-sen-ge (2nd time) ?-1329
- rGyal-ba-bzan-po 1329-1333
- dBan-p'yug-dpal 1333-1337
- bSod-nams-dpal 1337-1344
- rGyal-ba-bzan-po (2nd time) 1344-1347
- dBan-p'yug-brtson-'grus 1347-1350
- rGyal-ba-bzan-po (3rd time) 1350-1356
- Nam-mk'a'-bstan-pa'i-rgyal-mts'an 1357
- dPal-'bum (acting) ?-1360
- Nam-mk'a'-bstan-pa'i-rgyal-mts'an (2nd time?) 1364

=== Tibetan privileges ===
Tibetan monks sometimes carried arms, a custom that was forbidden in 1276. It was reported in 1278 that Tibetan monks on their way to a religious feast in Zhending beat the personnel to near death and that they made excessive and unlawful use of the courier services. This was such a common occurrence that the Yuan authorities repeatedly decreed that Tibetan monks should stop harassing the population and making unlawful use of authorization plaques while traveling. Tibetan monks often used the Yuan postal service for the transport of their personal goods.

Another common complaint about the Tibetan monks was their interference in matters of justice and law. Giving freedom to living beings was considered an act of merit among the Buddhists. This manifested in the pardoning of prisoners. According to the History, powerful people who violated the law bribed the Tibetan monks to ask for their release. The Tibetan monks performed a Buddhist ritual asking for the prisoners' release and good fortune. They asked to wear the gown of the empress and rode a yellow ox out the palace gates, releasing the prisoners. Officials of the Censorate brought this issue forward in 1313. In 1326, officials of the Central Secretariat even reported that the Tibetan monks' activities had expanded to festivals such as the New Year Festival, using it as an excuse to free prisoners.

In contrast to the lenience with which the Tibetan monks showed criminals, the Tibetan clerics of the Bureau of Buddhist and Tibetan Affairs treated their enemies with cruelty. In 1309, the Bureau decreed that in case of fights between Tibetan monks and the common people, the one who beat the monk would have his hand cut off and whoever insulted a monk would have his tongue cut out. This decree was soon repealed by the emperor who opposed it on ground that it was antithetical to Yuan law.

Tibetan monks were a protected and privileged class even among Buddhists and occupied a higher class than non-Tibetan Buddhists. In a Chinese Buddhist chronicle, the Tibetan monks were described as rude and behaving as though they were kings upon entering the palace. There was also a language barrier between them. There was no shared common language among the Buddhists and Sanskrit had not been studied by the Chinese since the Song dynasty. Chinese and Uyghur Buddhists had to converse with Tibetan Buddhists through translators. There were also differences in beliefs and practices. The Lamaism of the Tibetan Buddhists contained Tantric rites that often had a sexual character. Sexual union between appropriately consecrated individuals was considered a way to enlightenment and such representations in Lamaist art and rituals were not understood by the Chinese Buddhists, who saw them as foreign and objectionable. The Chinese monks also took issue with the blood offerings given to Mahakali, which included sacrificing human hearts and livers as attested by the Imperial Preceptor during Toghon Temür's reign.

=== Revolt ===
The Sakya hegemony over Tibet continued into the middle of the fourteenth century, although it was challenged by a revolt of the Drikung Kagyu sect with the assistance of Duwa of the Chagatai Khanate in 1285. The revolt was suppressed in 1290 when the Sakyas and the Yuan army under Temür Buqa, Kublai's grandson, burned Drigung Monastery and killed 10,000 people.

=== Decline of the Yuan ===
Between 1346 and 1354, the Yuan dynasty was weakening from uprisings in the main Chinese provinces. As Yuan declined, in Tibet, Tai Situ Changchub Gyaltsen toppled the Sakya and founded the Phagmodrupa dynasty, the rulers of which belonged to the Kagyu sect. The succession of Sakya lamas in Tibet came to an end in 1358, when central Tibet in its entirety came under control of the Kagyu sect, and Tibet's independence was restored, to last nearly 400 years. "By the 1370s the lines between the schools of Buddhism were clear." Nevertheless, the Phagmodrupa founder avoided directly resisting the Yuan court until its fall in 1368, when his successor Jamyang Shakya Gyaltsen decided to open relations with the Ming dynasty, founded by ethnic Han.

== Economy ==
Tibet contributed very little to the Yuan economy other than tea production. However the tea monopoly office in Tibet was abolished in 1311. Markets were set up to trade with Tibet in 1277 at Diaomen (around modern Ya'an) and Lizhou (modern Hanyuan). Tibet also produced gold at the "Gold Sand River" (Jinsha Jiang). The Yuan government charged families with mining gold and silver in Tibet but they were released from service in 1272. In 1289, Tibetans presented a black panther to the throne.

== Phagspa script ==
Kublai Khan commissioned Chögyal Phagpa to design a new writing system to unify the writing of the multilingual Mongol Empire. Chögyal Phagpa in turn modified the traditional Tibetan script and gave birth to a new set of characters called Phagspa script which was completed in 1268. Kublai Khan decided to use the Phagspa script as the official writing system of the empire, including when he became Emperor of China in 1271, instead of the Chinese ideogrammes and the Uyghur script. However, he encountered major resistances and difficulties when trying to promote this script and never achieved his original goal. As a result, only a small number of texts were written in this script, and the majority were still written in Chinese ideogrammes or the Uyghur alphabet. The script fell into disuse after the collapse of the Yuan dynasty in 1368. The script was, though never widely, used for about a century and is thought to have influenced the development of modern Korean script.

== See also ==
- Patron and priest relationship
- Bureau of Buddhist and Tibetan Affairs
- Tang–Tibet relations
- Song–Tibet relations
- Ming–Tibet relations
- Tibet under Qing rule
  - Lifan Yuan
- Yuan dynasty in Inner Asia
- Mongolia under Yuan rule
- Manchuria under Yuan rule
- Korea under Yuan rule
