= Drogön Chögyal Phagpa =

1st Sakya Tibetan ruler (1235–1280)

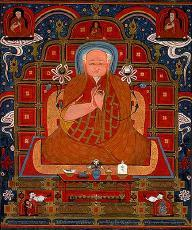
Drogon Chogyal Phagpa, one of the Five Sakya patriarchs, first Imperial Preceptor of the Yuan dynasty and vice-ruler of Tibet

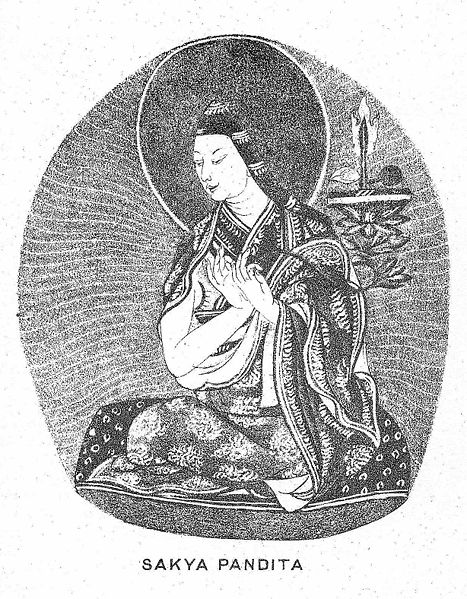
Sakya Pandita

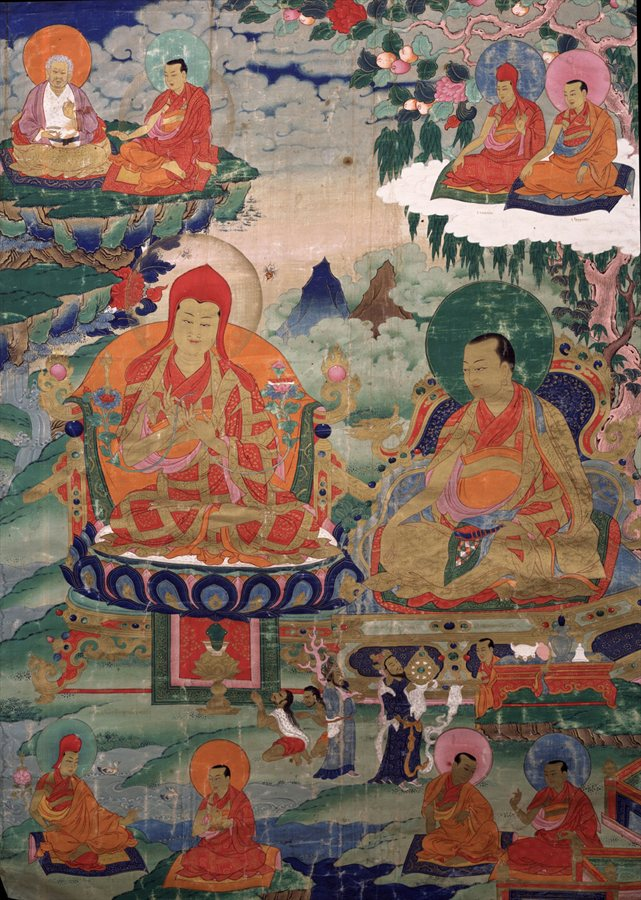
Sakya Pandita, Kunga Gyaltsen Pal Zangpo (1182–1251), wearing a tall red hat, the sixth throne holder of Sakya, great-grandson of Khon Konchog Gyalpo. Sakya Pandita is accompanied by his nephew Chogyal Phagpa

Drogön Chogyal Phagpa (Tibetan: འགྲོ་མགོན་ཆོས་རྒྱལ་འཕགས་པ།, Wylie: ʼgro mgon chos rgyal ʼphags pa; Chinese: 八思巴; 26 March 1235 – 15 December 1280) was the fifth leader of the Sakya school of Tibetan Buddhism. He was also the first Imperial Preceptor of the Yuan dynasty and was concurrently named the director of the Bureau of Buddhist and Tibetan Affairs, serving during the reign of Kublai Khan.

Historical tradition remembers him as the first vice-ruler of Tibet under the Yuan emperor as well as one of the Five Sakya patriarchs (Tibetan: ས་སྐྱ་གོང་མ་རྣམ་ལྔ་, Wylie: sa skya gong ma rnam lnga). Although this is historically disputed, he played a very important political role.

== Early life ==
Phagpa was born in Ngari (West Tibet) in 1235 as the son of Sönam Gyeltsen (Tibetan: བསོད་ནམས་རྒྱལ་མཚན་, Wylie: bsod nams rgyal mtshan, 1184–1239), a member of the Khön clan of Sakya (Tibetan: འཁོན་, Wylie: 'khon), which held hereditary power over the Sakya Monastery in Tsang, and his mother was Künga Kyi (Tibetan: ཀུན་དགའ་ཀྱིད་, Wylie: kun dga' kyid). The Red Annals name his mother as Jomo Konchog Kyi. He was the nephew of Sakya Pandita (1182–1251), who began the relationship between Sakya and the Mongol conquerors after their first invasion of Tibet in 1240.

In 1244, Sakya Pandita left Sakya to visit the royal camp of Godan Khan, son of Ögedei Khan, to act as an intermediary between the Mongols and Tibetans. He brought with him his young nephews, the ten-year-old Phagpa and his brother, the six-year-old Chakna Dorje. On the way, they stopped in Lhasa, where Phagpa took the vows of a śrāmaṇera at the Jokhang in front of the statue of the Jowo offered by the Princess Wencheng, the Chinese wife of Songtsen Gampo.

Sakya Pandita preached sermons along his way and arrived at Godan's camp in Liangzhou in 1247, where Mongol troops were exterminating Han Chinese by throwing them in a river. Sakya Pandita, horrified, gave religious instructions, in particular stressing that killing a sentient being is one of the worst acts according to Buddhism. He gave religious instruction to the prince and greatly impressed the court with his personality and powerful teachings. He is also said to have cured Godan of a serious illness.

In return, Drogon Chogyel Phagpa was supposedly given "temporal authority over the 13 myriarchies [Trikor Chuksum] of Central Tibet." Since the myriarchies had not yet emerged as a territorial unit, this cannot be entirely correct. Tibetan historians quote a letter that Sakya Pandita wrote to the local leaders of Tibet in 1249 where he stated that they henceforth must carry out the administration of their fiefs in consultation with the Sakya envoys and in accordance with Mongol law.

== Entering the service of Kublai Khan ==
After the death of Sakya Pandita, the Mongol ruler Möngke Khan dispatched new military campaigns against parts of Tibet in 1252–53. He furthermore shared the main Tibetan sects among the ruling clan. While he patronized the Drikung Kagyu, Godan Khan protected Sakya and there were at least nine further appanages. Phagpa and his brother remained at the camp of Godan, learned Middle Mongol. and took up Mongol dress.

Möngke's brother Kublai, after a brief flirtation with Chan Buddhism, found Tibetan Buddhism more to his liking. In 1253 he asked Godan to give him Chögyal Phagpa, who was then 18. Kublai was subsequently converted to Buddhism by his efforts and Phagpa became his tantric guru in 1258. Under the influence of Kublai's wife Chabi, their mutual relation was defined so that Phagpa had a precedence in religious matters and Kublai in temporal affairs. When the prince received religious instruction from his lama, the latter sat on a higher seat, while Kublai sat higher than Phagpa when he conducted court business. Phagpa further strengthened his case by defeating his Daoist opponents in a great debate in Kublai's newly built city Kaiping in 1258.

Shortly after, Kublai Khan took power in a succession struggle after the death of his brother Möngke in 1259. He thereby became the Khagan, the ruler of the Mongols; later on, he became the Emperor of China. Phagpa supported the new lord by presenting him as a chakravartin or universal ruler. Kublai Khan in turn appointed Chögyal Phagpa as State Preceptor (国师) in 1260, the year when he was proclaimed khagan. According to Mongol sources, Phagpa was the first one "to initiate the political theology politics of the relationship between state and religion in the Tibeto-Mongolian Buddhist world" - that is to say, he developed the concept of the priest and patron relationship. With the support of Kublai Khan who formally granted him authority over all Buddhist clergy in Tibet in June 1264, Chögyal Phagpa established himself and the Sakya as the preeminent political power in Tibet.

== Development of the Phagpa script ==
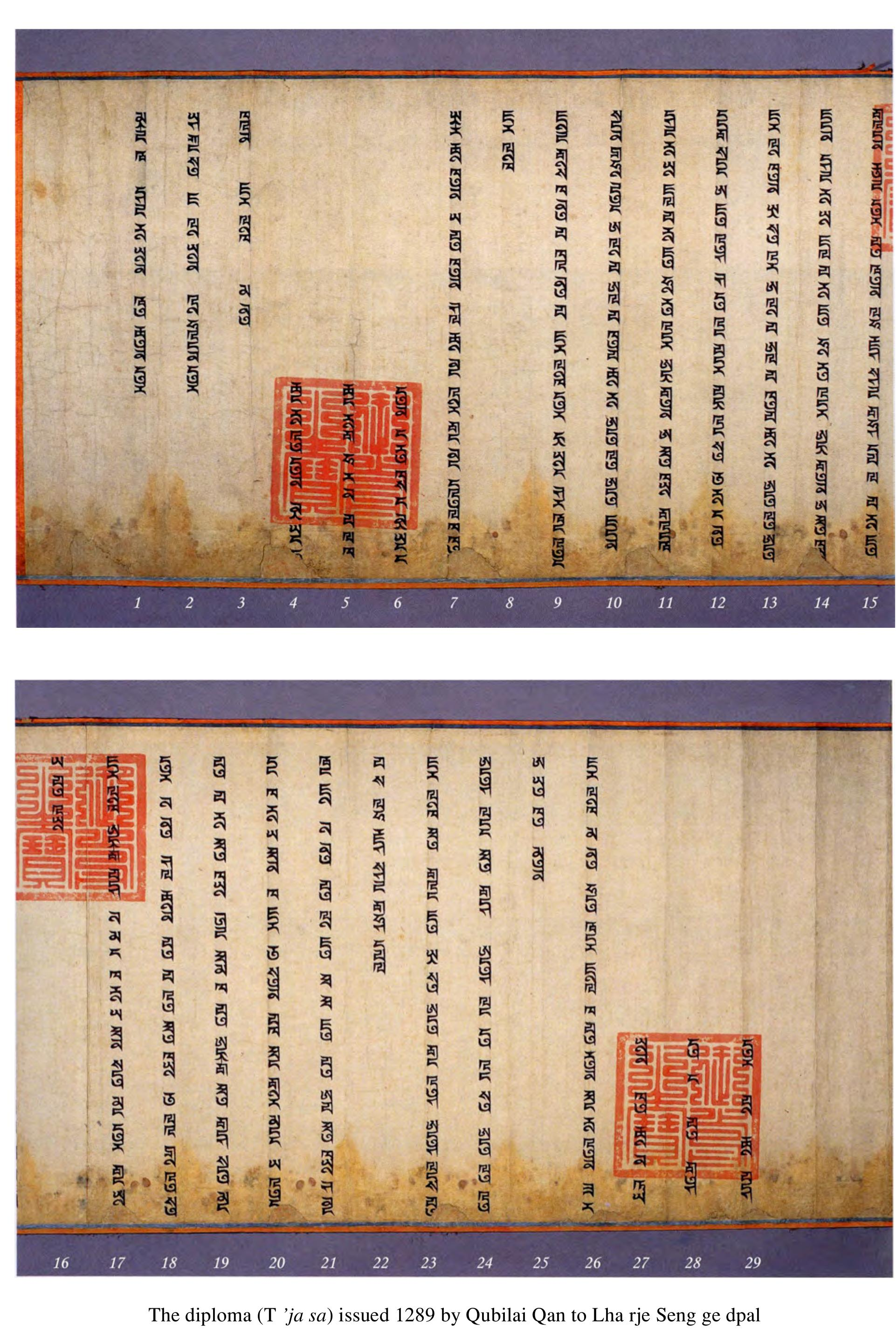
1289 Imperial edict of Kublai Khan, in Middle Mongolian language and Phags-pa script.

Kublai Khan commissioned Chögyal Phagpa to design a new writing system to unify the writing of the multilingual Yuan China. Phagpa modified the Tibetan alphabet to create his ʼPhags pa script, which was completed in 1269. Kublai Khan rewarded Phagpa by pormoting him to the newly created position of Imperial Preceptor (帝师) in charge of the newly founded Bureau of Buddhist and Tibetan Affairs. Kublai Khan decided to use the ʼPhags-pa script as the official writing system of the empire, including when he became Emperor of China in 1271, instead of Chinese characters or the Old Uyghur alphabet formerly used for Mongolian. However, he encountered major resistances and difficulties when trying to promote this script and never achieved his original goal. As a result, only a small number of texts were written in this script, and the majority (including most official documents) were still written in Chinese ideograms or the Uyghur alphabet. The script fell into disuse after the collapse of the Yuan in 1368. The script was used for about a century and is thought to have influenced the development of Hangul.

Phagpa's diaries for 1271 mention a foreign friend of Kublai Khan, who was quite possibly one of the elder Polos or even Marco Polo, although, unfortunately, no name is given.

== Creation of the Sakya-Yuan administrative system ==
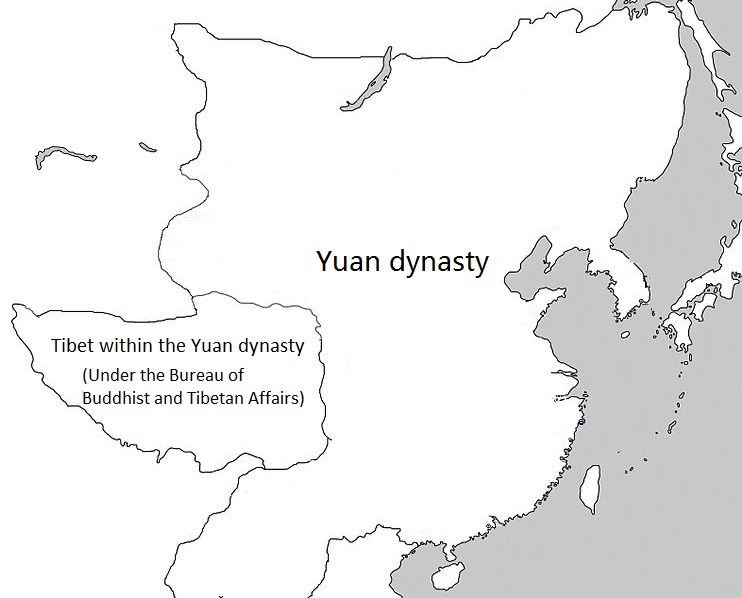
Tibet within the Yuan dynasty under the top-level department known as the Bureau of Buddhist and Tibetan Affairs (Xuanzheng Yuan).

The Sakya-Mongol alliance was strong, and the seat (Wylie: grwa sa or gdan sa) of the Sakya became the capital of Tibet. According to later historiography, Kublai Khan (who founded of the Yuan dynasty in 1271) granted the three cholka or regions of Tibet (Ü-Tsang, Amdo and Kham) to Phagpa as a reward for the initiation in the Buddhist faith. The donation would have taken place in 1253. However, this tradition has been qualified by recent research. As mentioned above, Kublai's brother and predecessor Möngke Khan divided Central Tibet into appanages obedient under various Mongol princes in 1251. In the next year he issued a decree saying that the main Buddhist precepts to be followed in Tibet were to be those of Sakya. In about 1260 the appanage system was withdrawn, and Phagpa, receiving the title State Preceptor (Guoshi), was acknowledged as the supreme head of the Buddhist clergy.

In 1264, Kublai Khan established the Bureau of Buddhist and Tibetan Affairs. At about the same time, Phagpa was sent from the court to Tibet in order to persuade the local leaders to accept the imposition of Mongol administration. It was his first visit to his homeland since childhood. Phagpa received the new title of Imperial Preceptor (Dishi) in 1270, partly as a reward for his invention of the Phagpa script. As such, he was expected to stay close to the emperor and had a paramount influence over the Bureau of Buddhist and Tibetan Affairs. His decrees carried the weight of the imperial court which gave him a strong authority over Tibetan affairs.

However, Phagpa mostly resided in Lintao in Gansu and apparently had desultory contacts with the emperor. He vacated the post by 1274 and returned to Sakya, leaving the title to his younger half-brother, Rinchen Gyaltsen. Phagpa's family would go on to hold the Imperial Preceptorate until his nephew Dharmaraksita's death in 1287.

Kublai Khan made Phagpa's other brother Chakna Dorje viceroy of Tibet in 1264. However, he died in 1267 and no new viceroy was appointed for many years. His untimely death was followed by a rebellion led by the Drikung Kagyu, the main opponents of the Sakya. Kublai Khan sent a punitive force to Tibet, which suppressed the uprising by 1268.

Temporal administration of Tibet was actually in the hands of officials from Sakya known as dpon-chen or pönchen. Their functions were defined as follows: "He governs by order of the lama and by the mandate of the emperor. He protects the two laws (religious and civil) and keeps the realm tranquil and the religion flourishing." A dpon-chen with responsibility for Central Tibet was stationed in Sakya from c. 1264. An implemented Mongol rule began about 1268-69 when a census was carried out and a Mongol administrative structure was set up. By this time Central Tibet was divided into 13 trikor, usually rendered in English as "myriarchies", each under a local lord called tripon. Meanwhile, other Sakya dpon-chen resided in Gongyo in Doto (Kham) and Lingtsang in Doma (Amdo). The dpon-chen of Ü-Tsang in this period were:

- Shakya Zangpo (c. 1264–1270)
- Kunga Zangpo (c. 1270–1275)
- Zhangtsun (c. 1275-?)
- Chukpo Gangkarwa (?-1280)

== Last years and death ==
Phagpa and his successors as Sakya lamas were not literally viceroys under the Yuan although they were at the center of the Yuan administrative system in Tibet. Moreover, after Phagpa the offices of Imperial Preceptor and Sakya Trizin were kept strictly separate. While the later chronicles depict Phagpa and his successors as ruling over the 13 myriarchies and in an extended sense over the three cholka, the authority of the Sakya Trizin was restricted to spiritual affairs. Given the paramount importance of the Buddhist religious hierarchy in Tibet, this still gave him an amount of influence.

Phagpa spent his last years in Tibet, where he was busy strengthening Sakya-Yuan authority over the still-restless country. He convened a general conference of the Buddhist hierarchs in 1277 with both spiritual and political leanings. He died in the Lhakhang palace in Sakya on 15 December 1280. There was an unsubstantiated rumour that he had been poisoned by the former pönchen Kunga Zangpo, whom he had dismissed some years previously for highhanded conduct. This led to an armed intervention by an army of Mongols and Amdo Tibetans in the next year, resulting in the execution of Kunga Zangpo and the strengthening of Mongol military presence in Tibet.

The system lasted until about the middle of the 14th century. During the reign of the 14th Sakya Trizin, Lama Dampa Sonam Gyaltsen, the myriarch Tai Situ Changchub Gyaltsen of the Phagmodrupa dynasty began to expand his power in the central province of Ü, marking the "beginning of the end of the period of Sakya power in Central Tibet."

== Cultural references ==
Phagpa is played by James Hong in the 1982 miniseries Marco Polo. In the series he is erroneously depicted as alive at the time of the departure of Marco Polo from China in 1293.

== Translations ==
Chogyal Phagpa: The Emperor's Guru (Sakya Kongma Series Book 5). Translated by Christopher Wilkinson (CreateSpace, 2014).

Advice to Kublai Khan: Letters by the Tibetan Monk Chogyal Phagpa to Kublai Khan and his Court. Translated by Christopher Wilkinson (CreateSpace, 2015).

At the Court of Kublai Khan: Writings of the Tibetan Monk Chogyal Phagpa. Translated by Christopher Wilkinson (CreateSpace, 2016).

== See also ==
- Tibet under Yuan rule
- Bureau of Buddhist and Tibetan Affairs
- History of Tibet
- Mongol conquest of Tibet
- Patron and priest relationship

== Footnotes ==
Preceded by Sakya Pandita	Sakya lama of Tibet (Yuan overlordship); 1260–1280	Succeeded by Dharmapala Raksita
Preceded by none	Tibetan Imperial Preceptor; 1270–1274	Succeeded by Rinchen Gyaltsen
