= Dpon-chen =

Governor of Tibet during the Yuan dynasty

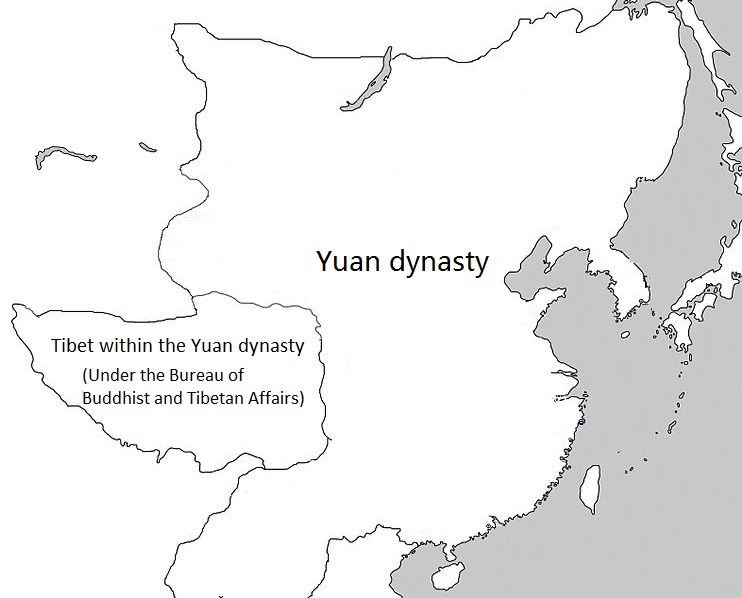
Tibet within the Yuan dynasty under the top-level department known as the Bureau of Buddhist and Tibetan Affairs (Xuanzheng Yuan).

The dpon-chen or pönchen (Chinese: 本欽; pinyin: Běnqīn), literally the "great authority" or "great administrator", was the chief administrator or governor of Tibet based at the Sakya Monastery during the Yuan dynasty. The office was established in the 1260s and functioned as the Tibetan local government serving the Yuan emperors, unlike the Sakya Imperial Preceptors (Dishi) who were active in the Yuan imperial court.

The Yuan dynasty set up a government agency and top-level administrative department known as the Bureau of Buddhist and Tibetan Affairs in Dadu (modern-day Beijing) that supervised Buddhist monks in addition to managing the territory of Tibet; one of the department's purposes was to select a dpon-chen to govern Tibet when the Sakya Lama (e.g. Drogön Chögyal Phagpa) was away. The Dpon-Chen was invariably a Tibetan nominated by the ruling Sakya Lama and approved by the reigning emperor. His function was, apart from being the chief executive head of the Sakya Government, to appoint a tripön for each of the 13 myriarchies, and to act as liaison between the Yuan government and Tibet. Nevertheless, this system also led to conflicts between the Sakya leaders and the dpon-chens. While dpon-chens had a small army in Sakya itself, their major military support came from the Yuan imperial court when an internal rebellion or external invasion occurred. As the Yuan dynasty declined in the mid-14th century however, in Tibet, Tai Situ Changchub Gyaltsen toppled the Sakya and founded the Phagmodrupa dynasty, marking the end of the dpon-chen system.

== See also ==
- Tibet under Yuan rule
- Bureau of Buddhist and Tibetan Affairs
- Sakya
- List of rulers of Tibet
