= Sakya Monastery =

Tibetan Monastery in Sa'gya, Tibet

- Tibetan transcription(s); Tibetan: ས་སྐྱ་དགོན། Wylie transliteration: sa skya dgon
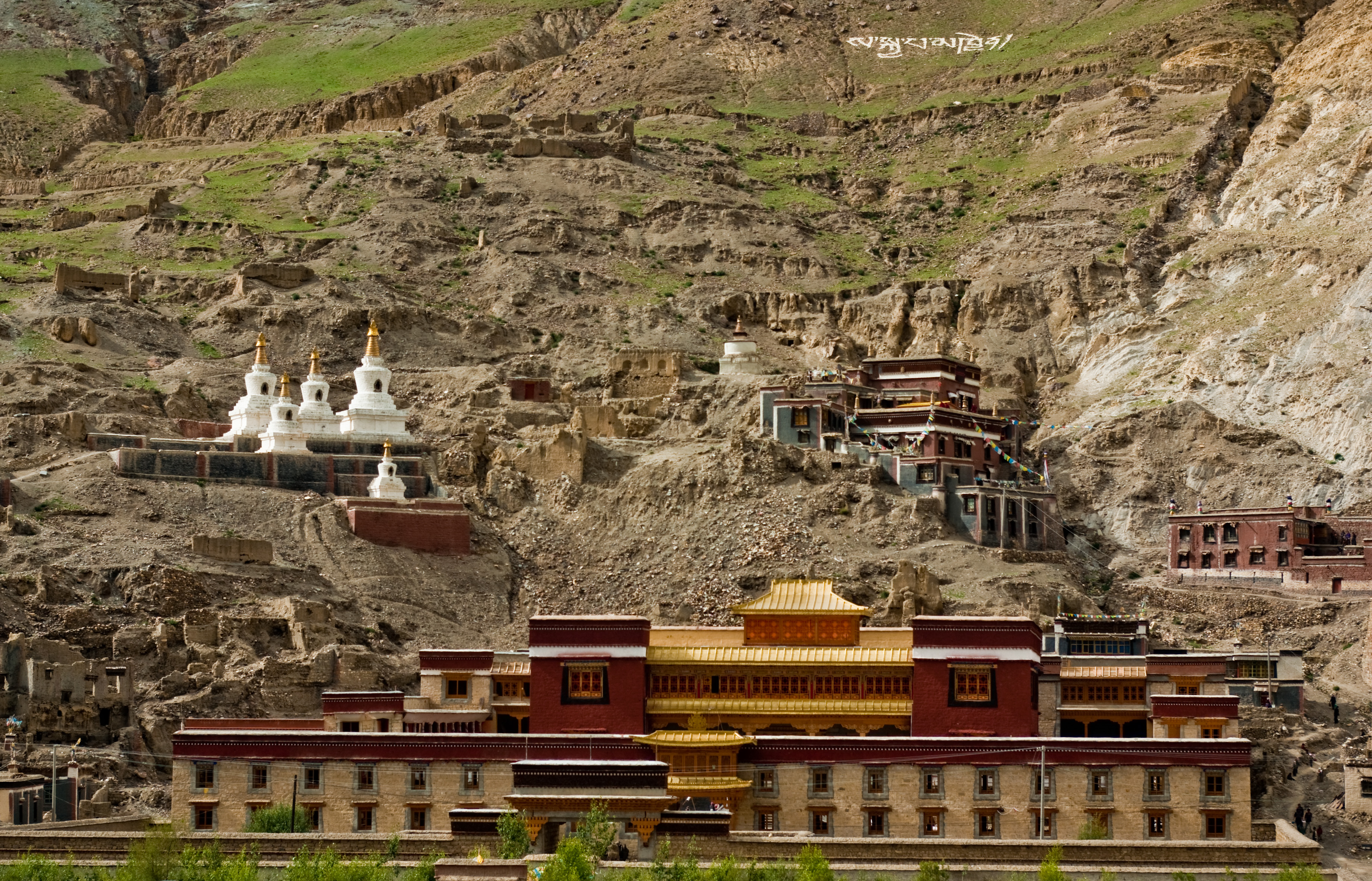
- Sakya Monastery

- Location within Tibet Autonomous Region

Religion
- Affiliation: Tibetan Buddhism
- Sect: Sakya
- Leadership: Sakya Trizin

Location
- Location: Shigatse Prefecture, Tibet Autonomous Region, China
- Coordinates: 28°54′18″N 88°1′5″E

Architecture
- Founder: Khön Könchok Gyalpo
- Established: 1071; 955 years ago

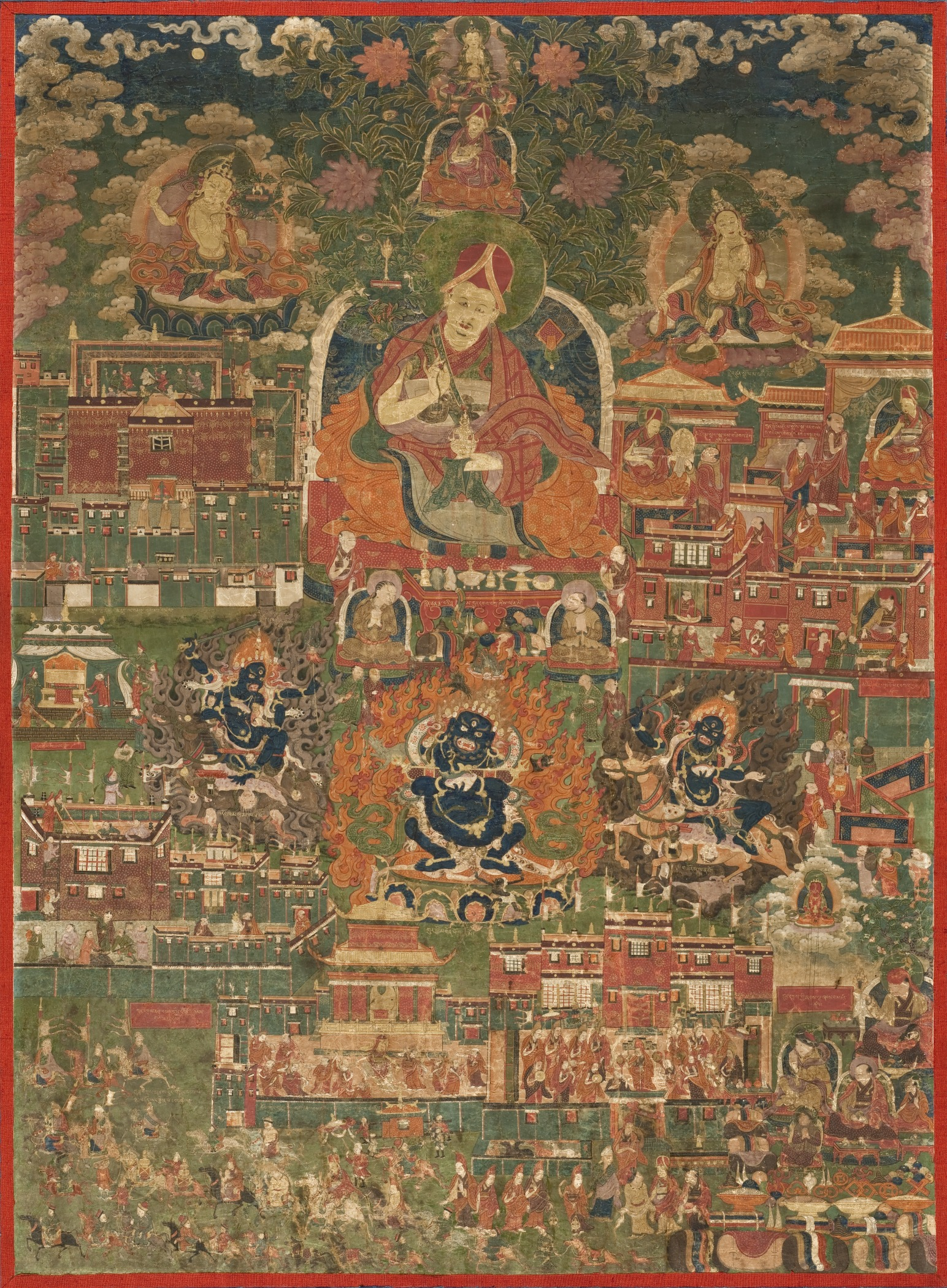
Kunga Tashi and Incidents from His Life (Abbot of Sakya Monastery, 1688–1711)

Sakya Monastery (Tibetan: ས་སྐྱ་དགོན་པ།, Wylie: sa skya dgon pa), also known as Pel Sakya (Tibetan: དཔལ་ས་སྐྱ།, Wylie: dpal sa skya; "White Earth" or "Pale Earth"), is a Buddhist monastery situated in Sa'gya Town (ས་སྐྱ་), Sa'gya County, about 127 kilometres (79 mi) west of Shigatse in the Tibet Autonomous Region, China. The monastery is considered the seat of the Sakya (or Sakyapa) school of Tibetan Buddhism.

== History ==
Sakya Monastery was founded in 1073, by Khön Könchok Gyalpo (Tibetan: དཀོན་མཆོག་རྒྱལ་པོ།, Wylie: dkon mchog rgyal po; 1034–1102), originally a Nyingmapa monk of the powerful House of Khön of Tsang, who became the first Sakya Trizin.

The "southern monastery" was founded under the orders of Drogön Chögyal Phagpa in 1268, across a river from the earlier structures. 130,000 workers were reportedly drafted for its construction. Its powerful abbots governed Tibet during the 13th and the 14th centuries under the overlordship of Yuan China after the downfall of the Tibetan Empire, until they were eclipsed by the rise of the new Kagyu and Gelug schools of Tibetan Buddhism. Most of the southern monastery was burned down in the 16th century. It was only restored to its previous size in 1948.

Its architecture is quite different from that of temples in Lhasa and the Yarlung Valley. The only surviving ancient building is the Lhakang Chempo or Sibgon Trulpa. Originally a cave in the mountainside, it was built in 1268 by dpon-chen Sakya Sangpo and restored in the 16th century. It contains some of Tibet's most magnificent surviving artwork, which appears not to have been damaged in recent times. The Gompa grounds cover more than 18,000 square meters, while the huge main hall covers some 6000 square meters.

After the 10 March 1959 Lhasa uprising to protect the 14th Dalai Lama from the Communist Chinese People's Liberation Army, the majority of Sakya Monastery's monks were forced to leave. As Dawa Norbu states in his book, "previously there were about five hundred monks in the Great Sakya Monastery, but by the end of 1959 only 36 aged monks remained." The northern monastery was destroyed during the Cultural Revolution, while the southern half escaped from destruction. The monastery was renovated and rebuilt in 2002.

Das Sharat Chandra writes:

As to the great library of Sakya, it is on shelves along the walls of the great hall of the Lhakhang chen-po. There are preserved here many volumes written in gold letters; the pages are six feet long by eighteen inches in breadth. In the margin of each page are illuminations, and the first four volumes have in them pictures of the thousand Buddhas. These books are bound in iron. They were prepared under orders of the Emperor Kublai Khan, and presented to the Phagpa lama on his second visit to Beijing.

There is also preserved in this temple a conch shell with whorls turning from left to right [in Tibetan, Ya chyü dungkar], a present from Kublai to Phagpa. It is only blown by the lamas when the request is accompanied by a present of seven ounces of silver; but to blow it, or have it blown, is held to be an act of great merit."

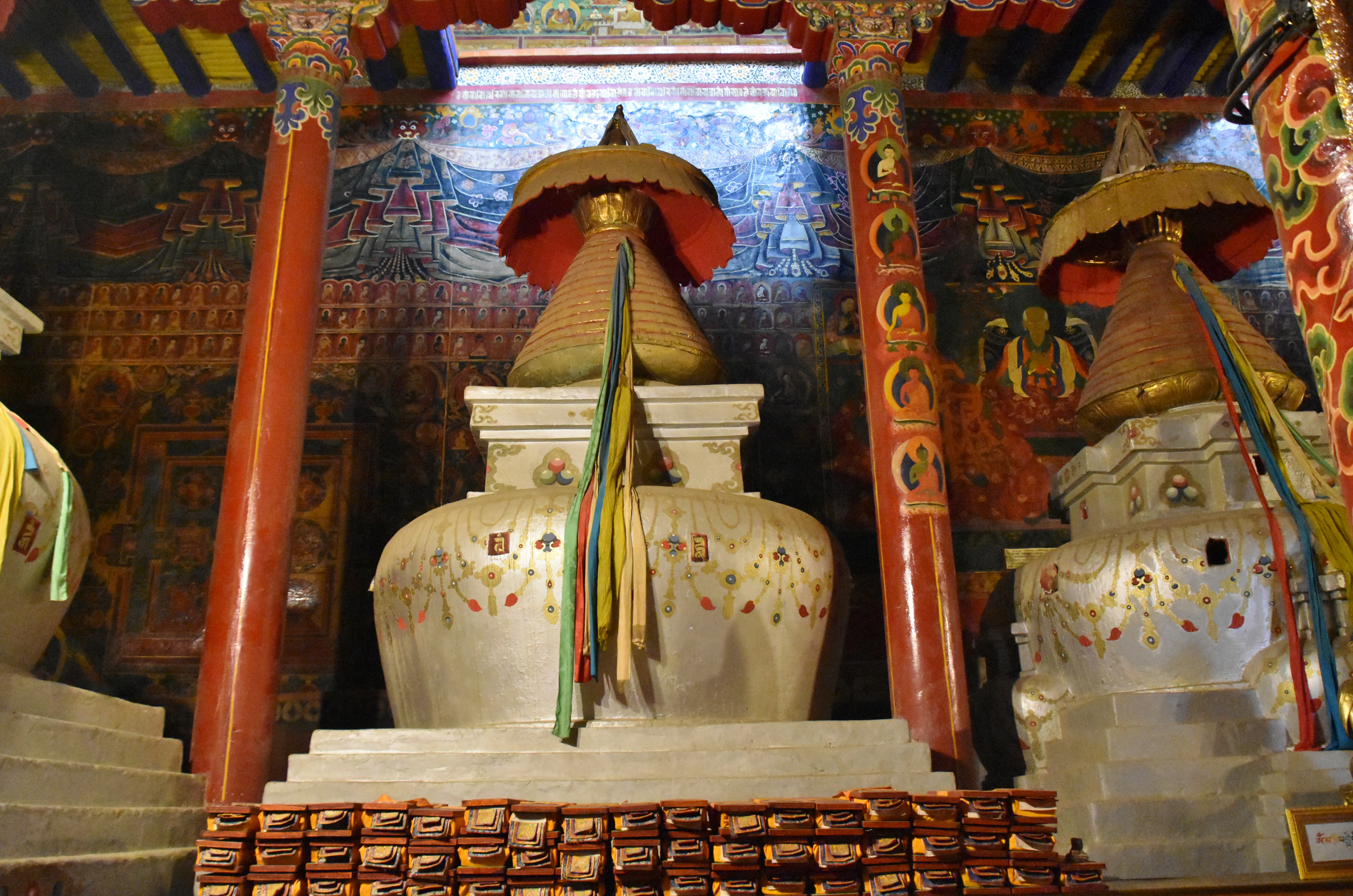

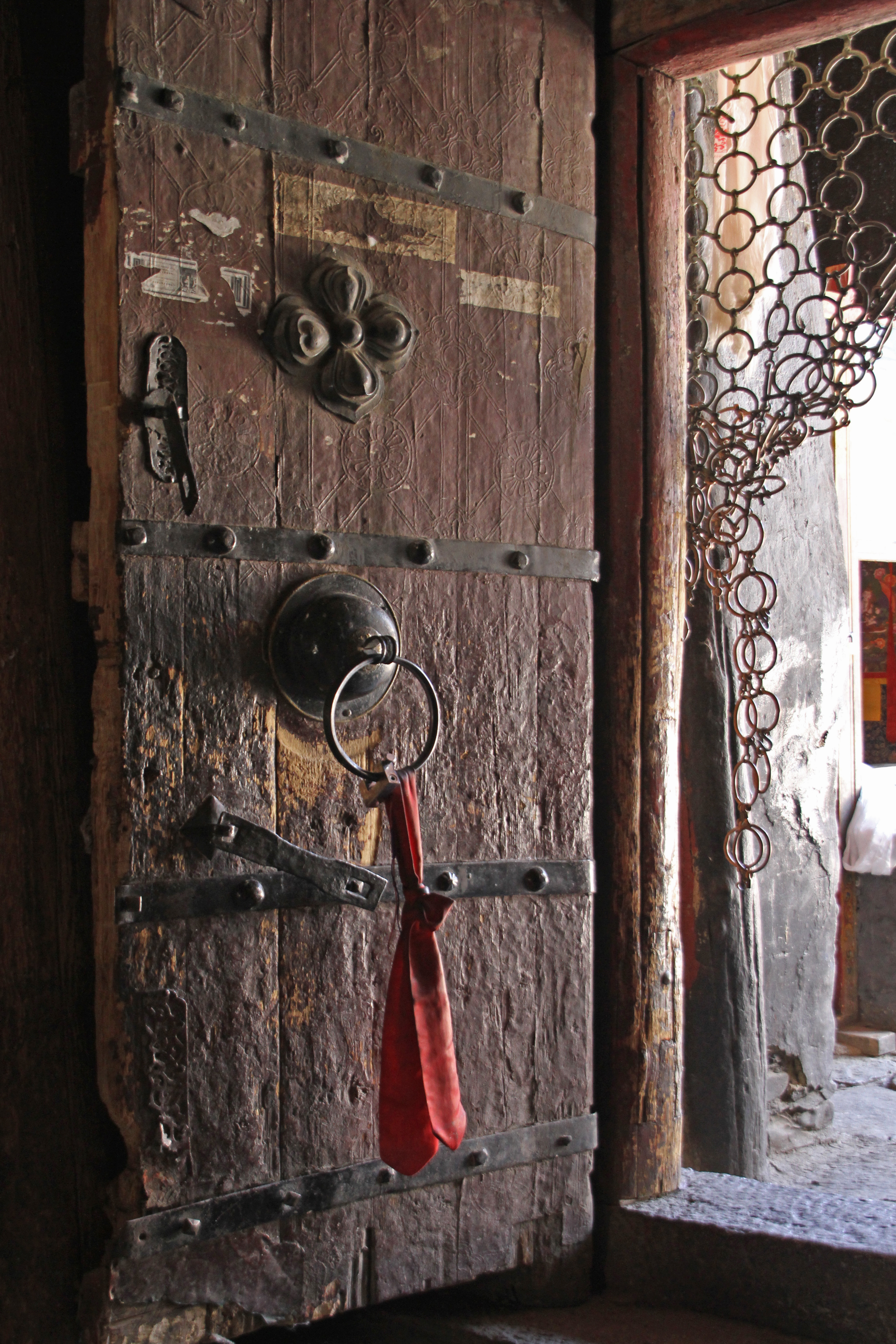

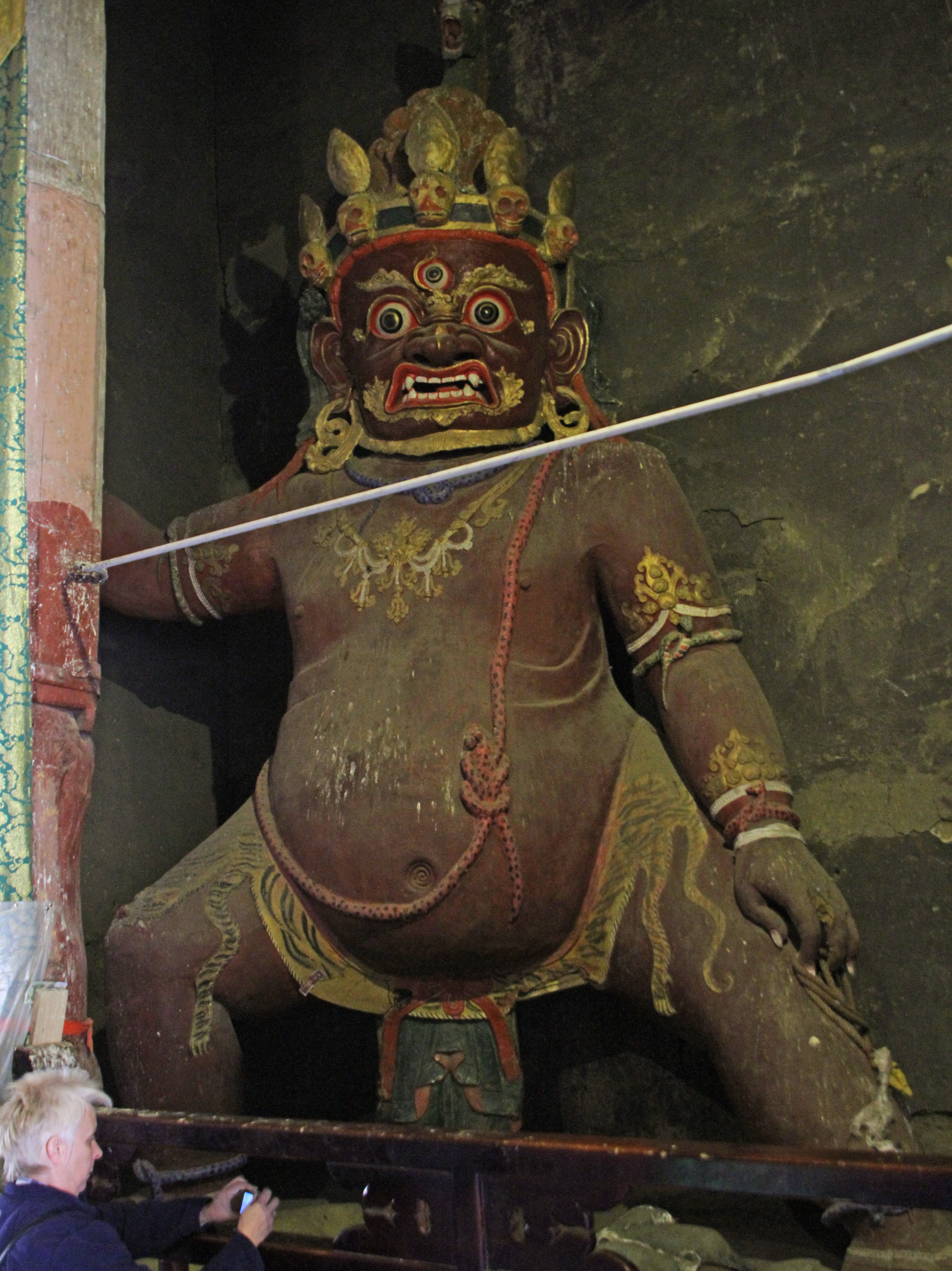

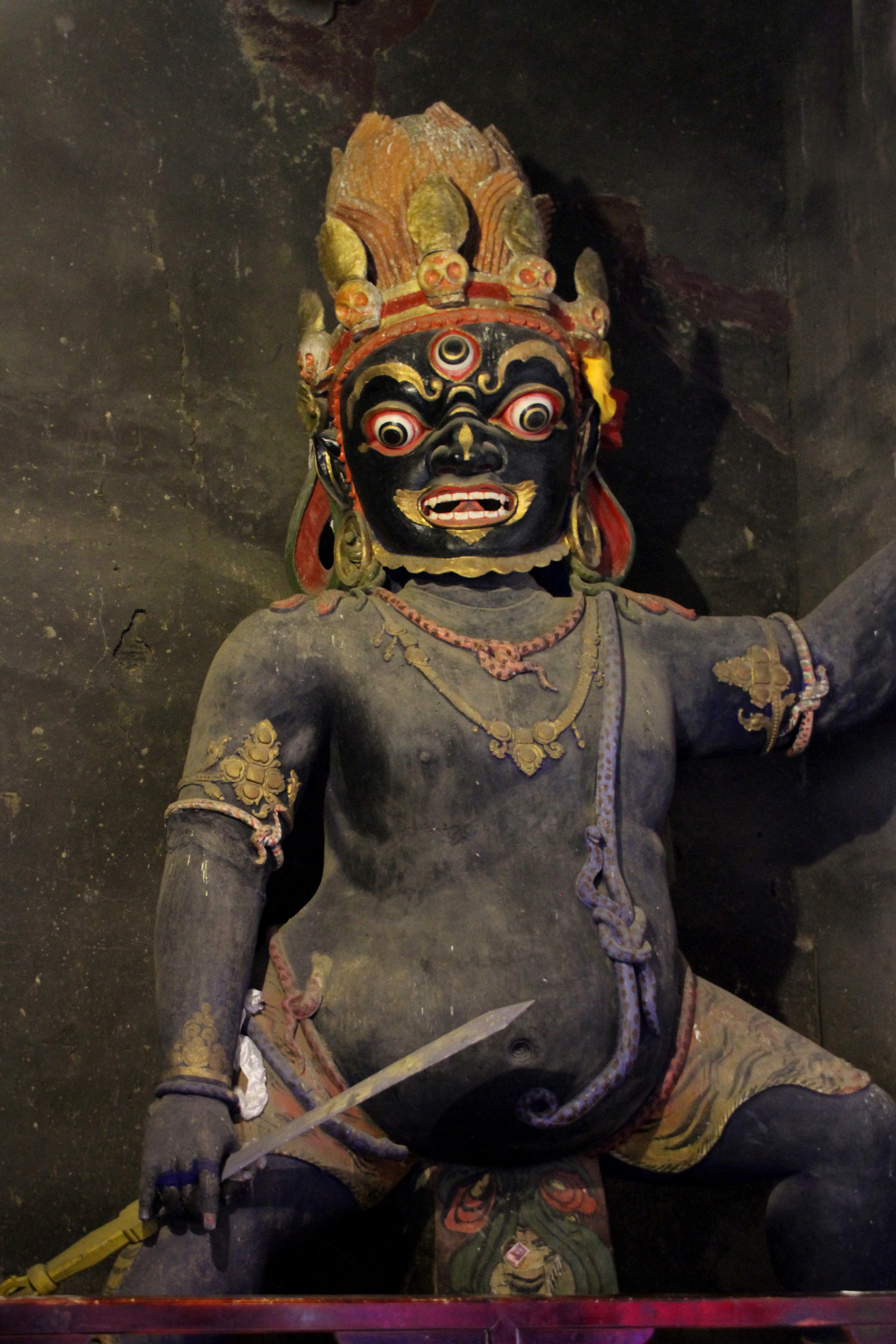

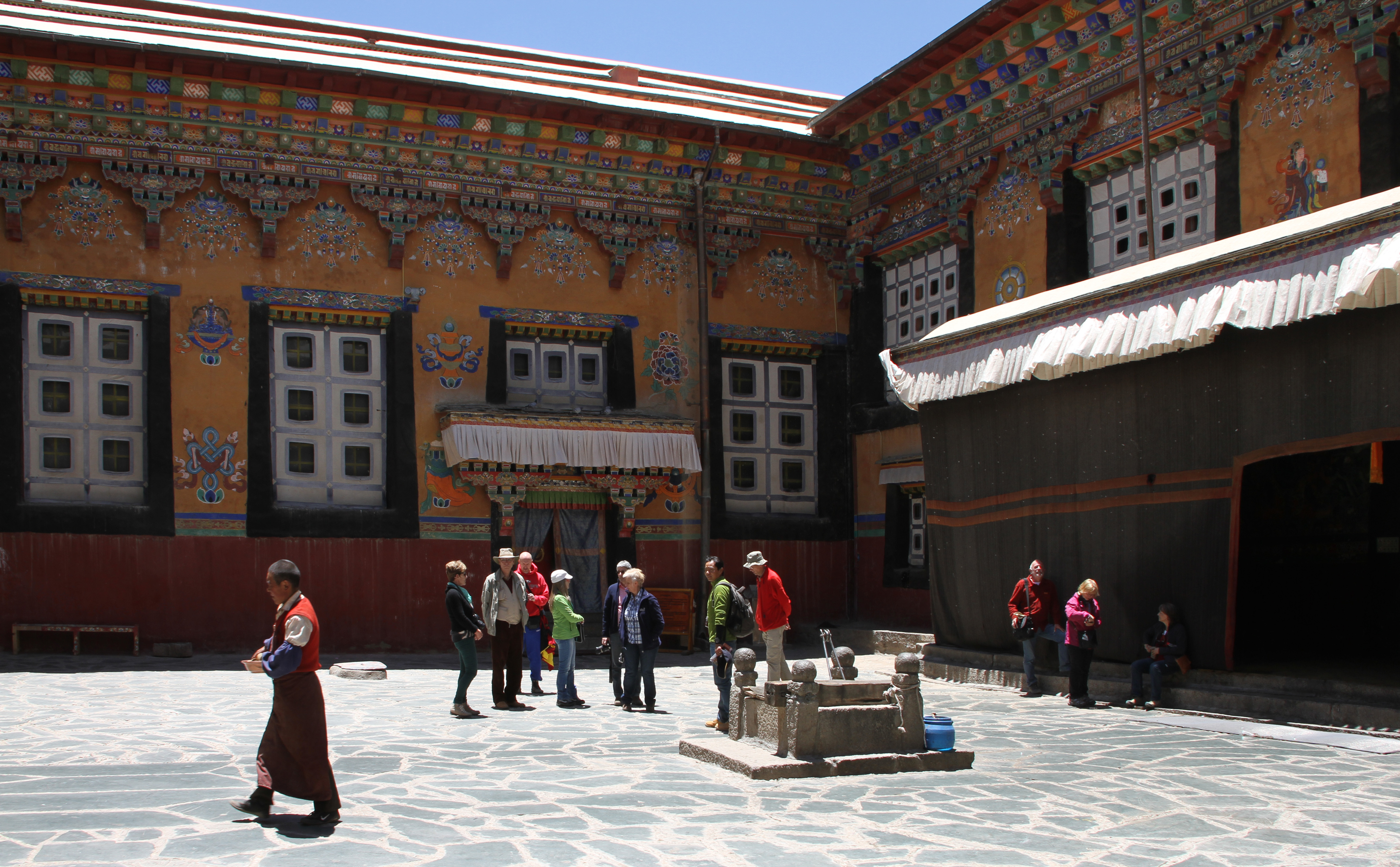

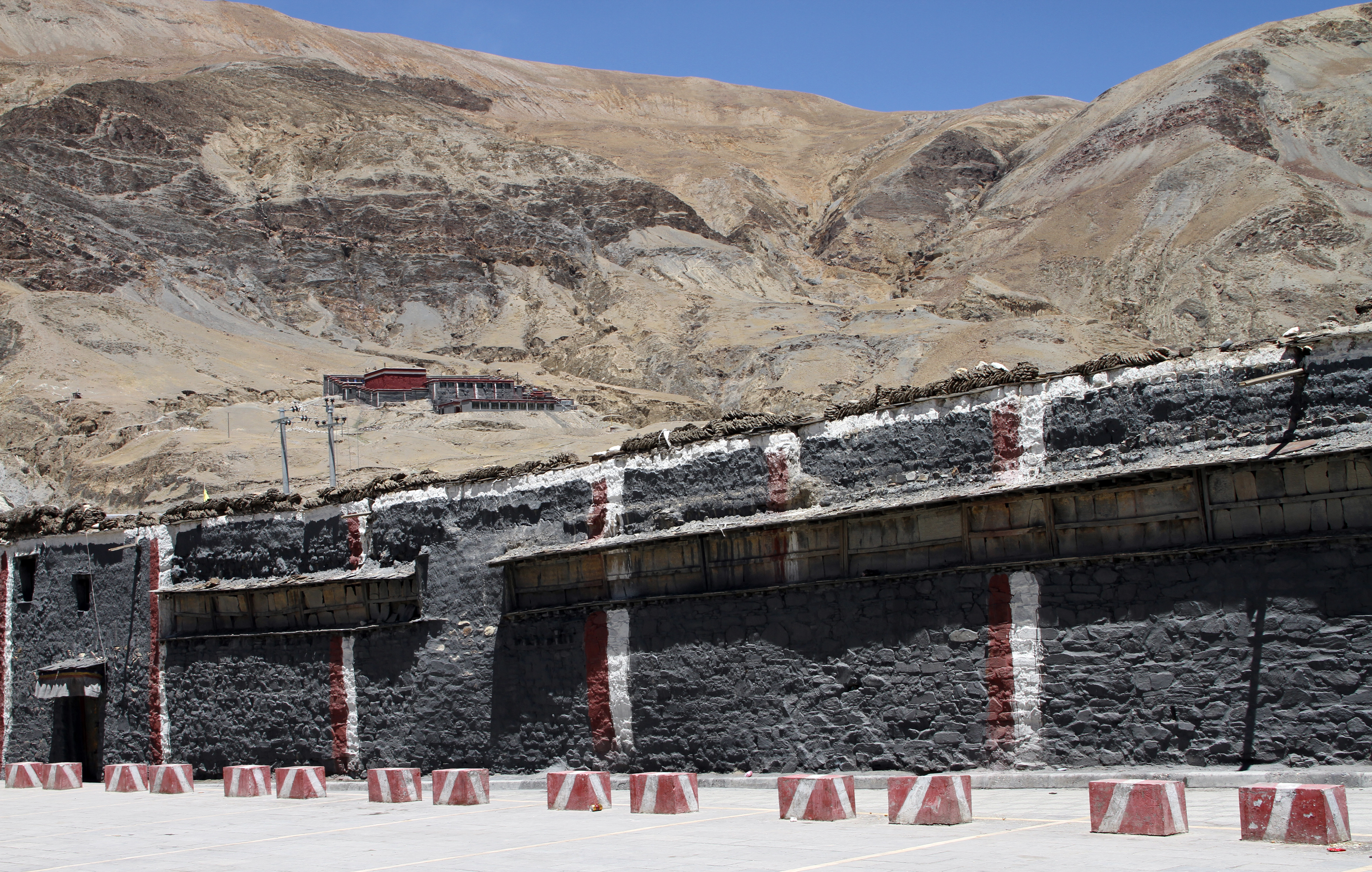

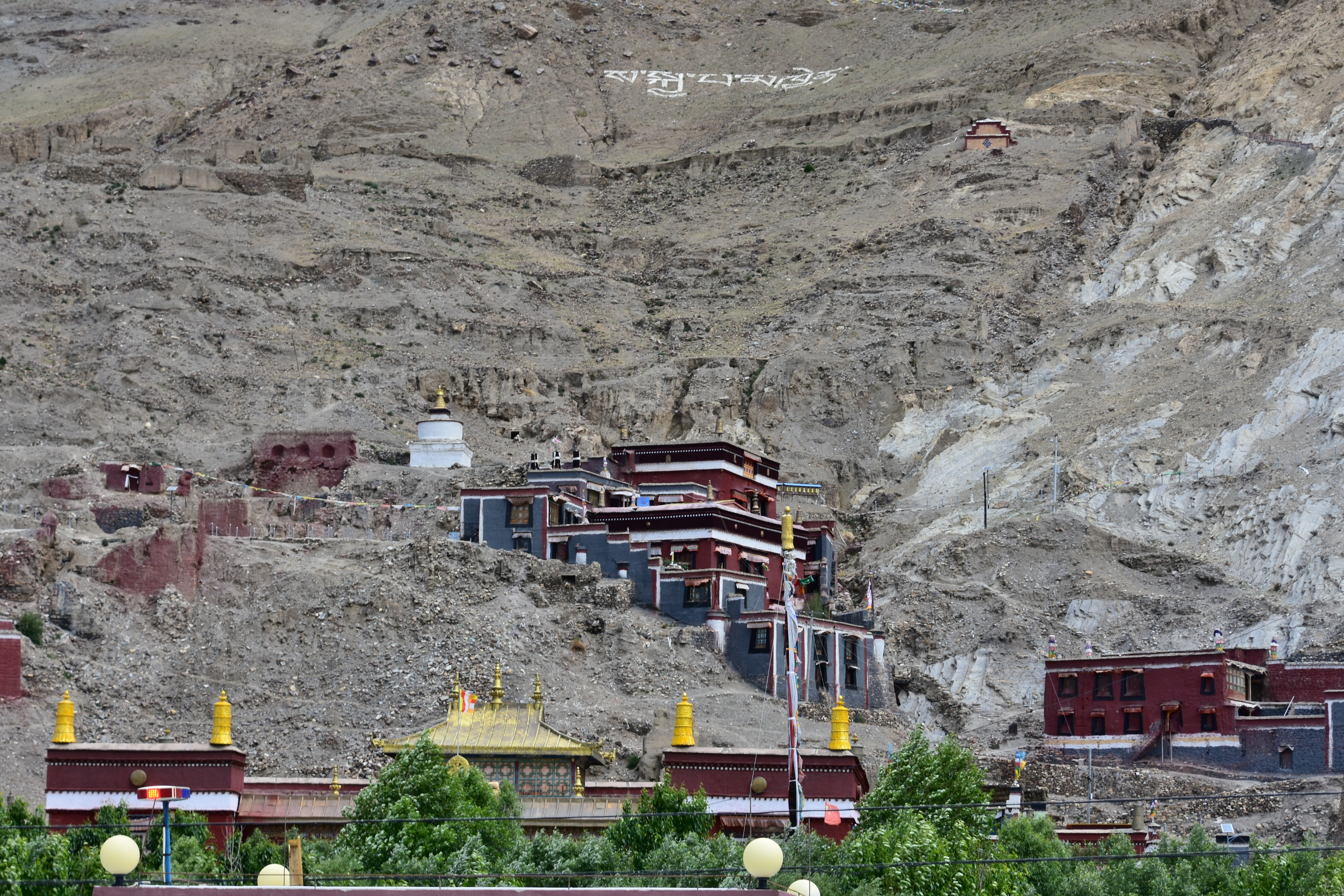

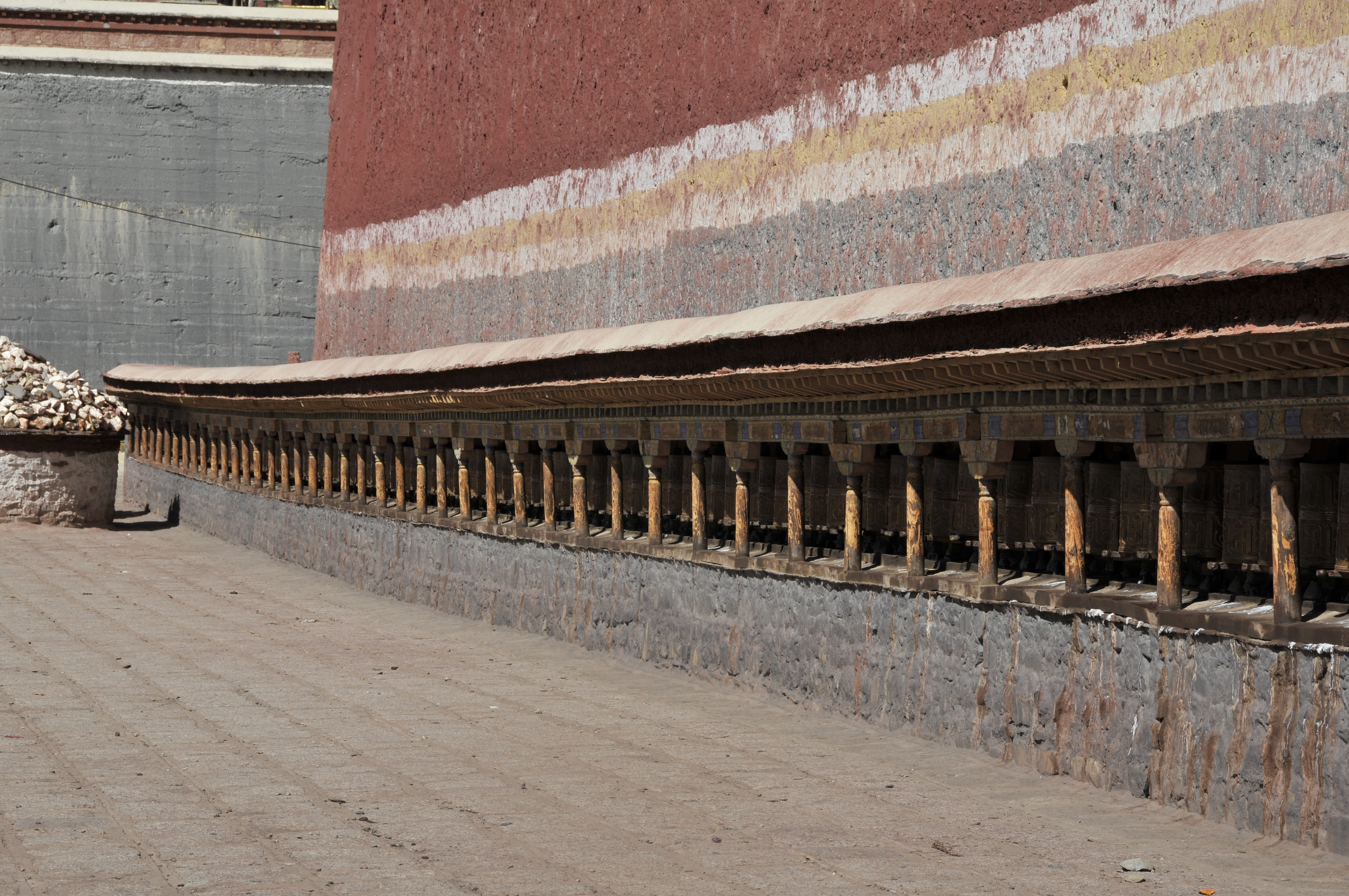

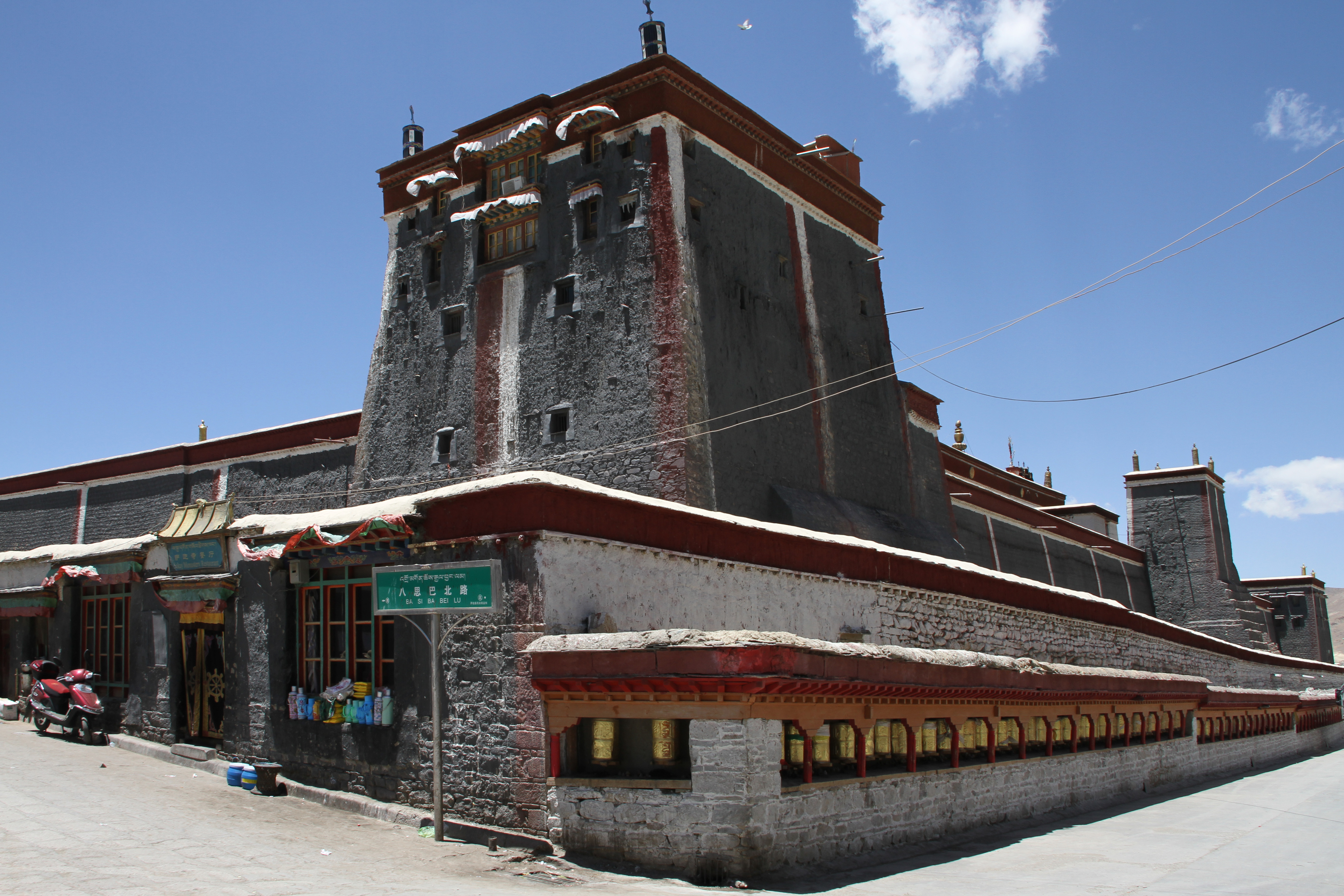

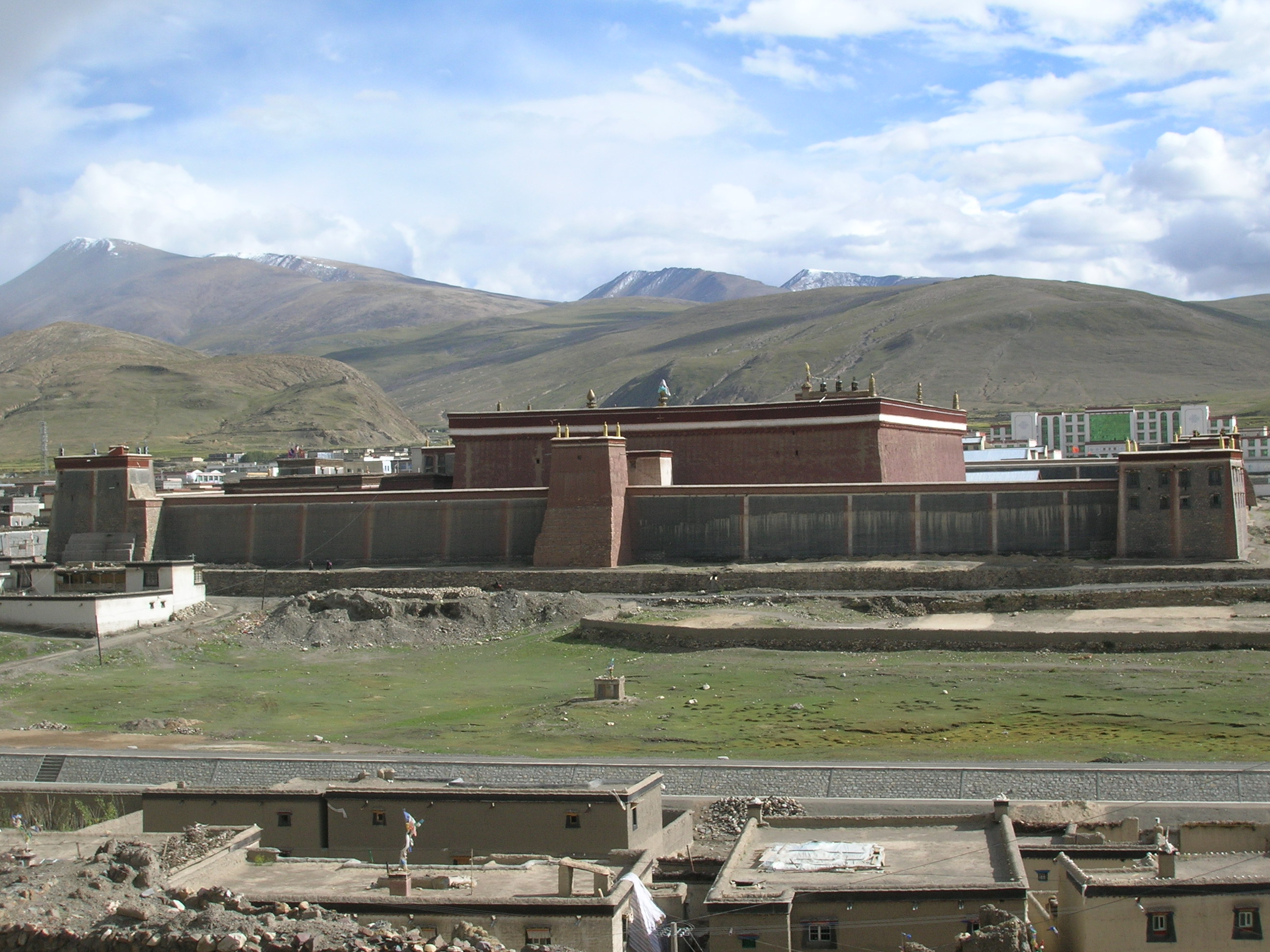

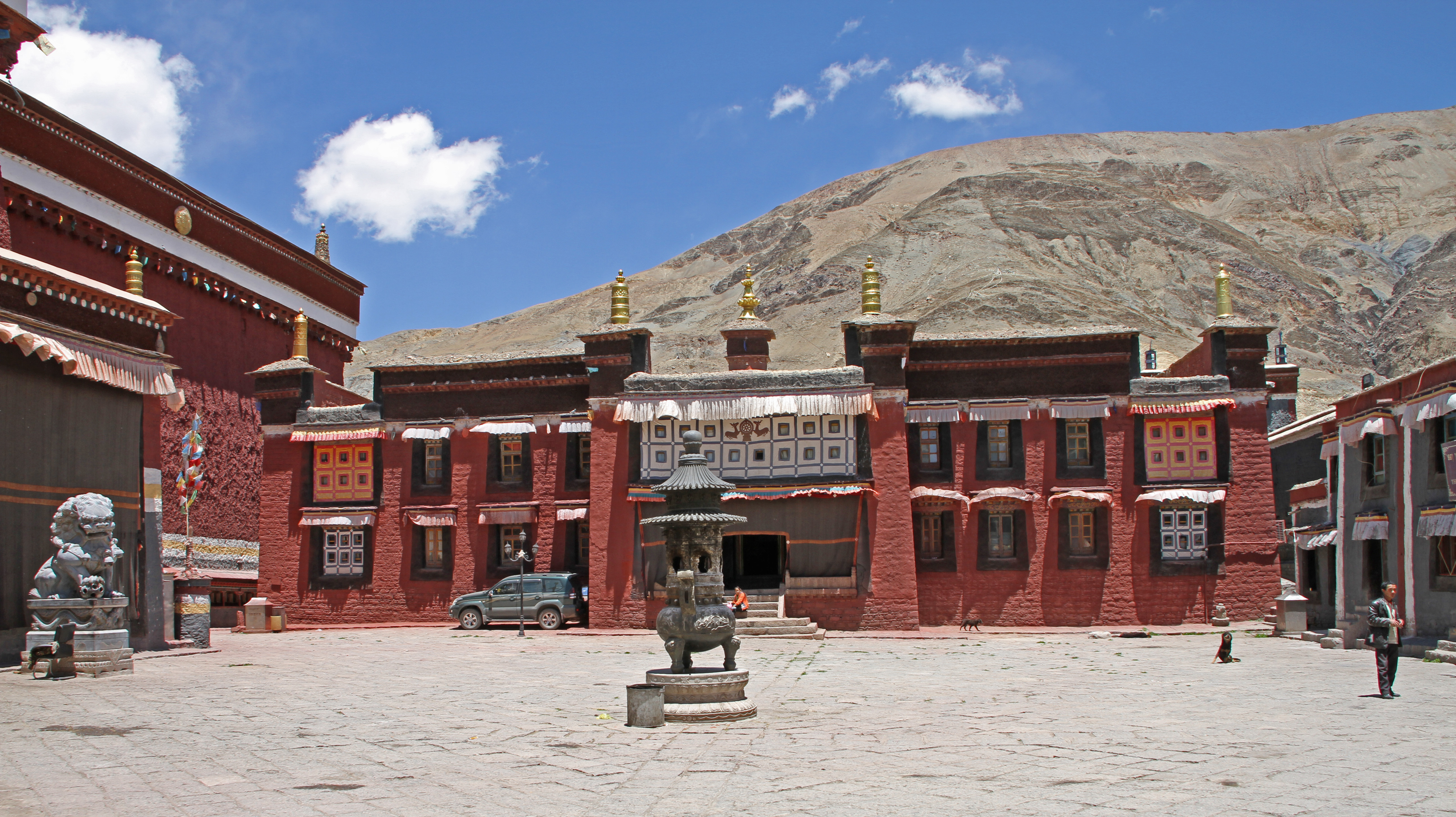

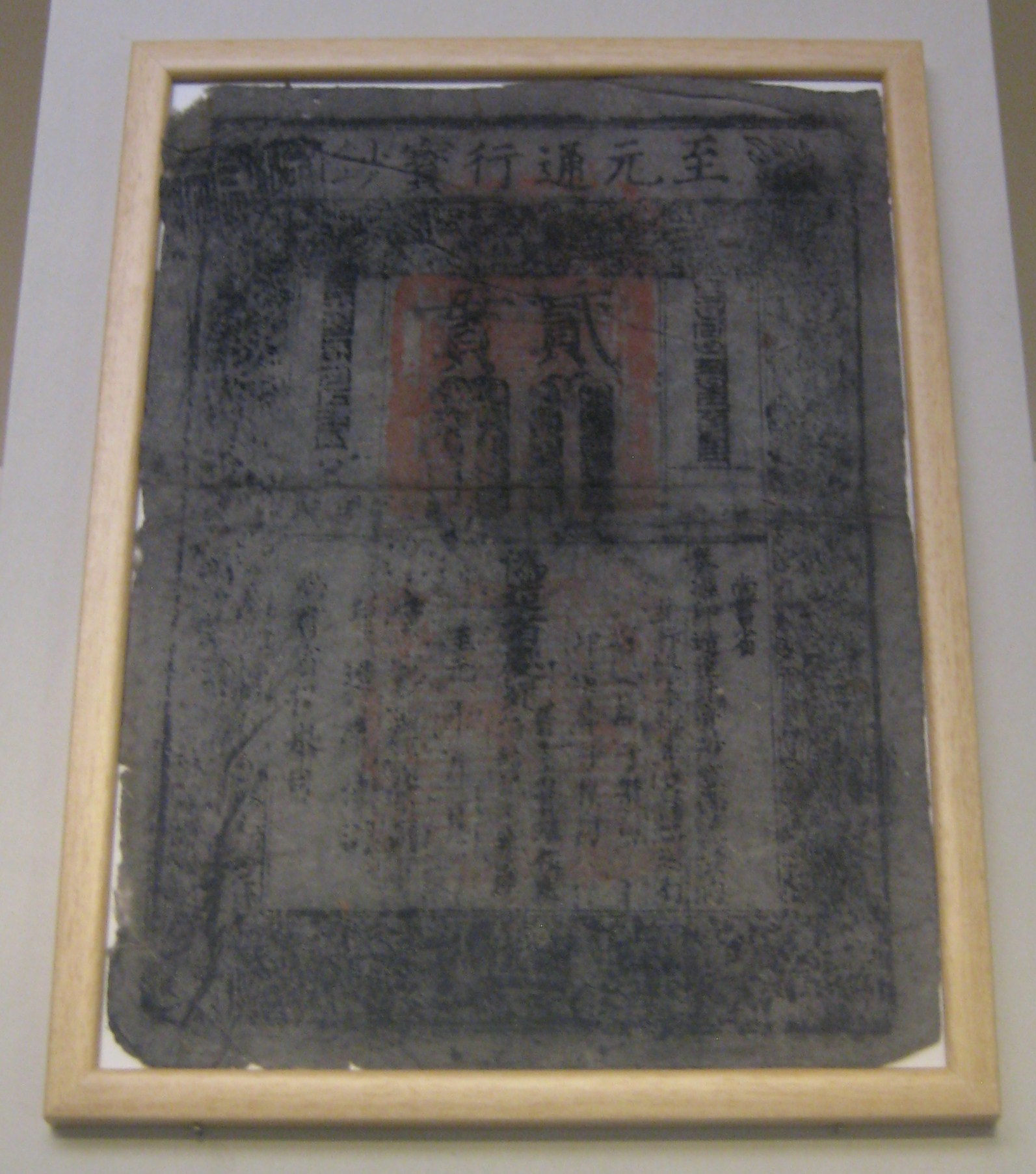

== Library and art ==
Sakya Monastery houses a huge library of as many as 84,000 books on traditional stacks 60 metres (200 ft) long and 10 metres (33 ft) high. Most of them are Buddhist scriptures, although they also include works of literature, history, philosophy, astronomy, mathematics, agriculture, and art. One scripture weighs more than 500 kilograms (1,100 lb), the heaviest in the world. The collection also includes many volumes of palm-leaf manuscripts, which are well-preserved due to the region's arid climate. In 2003, the library was examined by the Tibet Academy of Social Sciences. The monastery started to digitize the library in 2011. As of 2022, all books have been cataloged, and more than 20% have been fully digitized. Monks now maintain a digital library for all scanned books and documents.

More than 3,000 murals in Sakya Monastery depict religious, historical and cultural themes, including valuable records of historical scenes such as Phagpa's meeting with Kublai Khan and the monastery's founding. The main library hall contains a 66-meter-long mural showing the life of Gautama Buddha. There are also more than 1,100 pieces of porcelain in the hall, dating from the Yuan dynasty to early 14th century.

Claims that the library contains records dating back 10,000 years have circulated on the Internet, but are untrue.

=== Gallery ===
Sakya Monastery Library

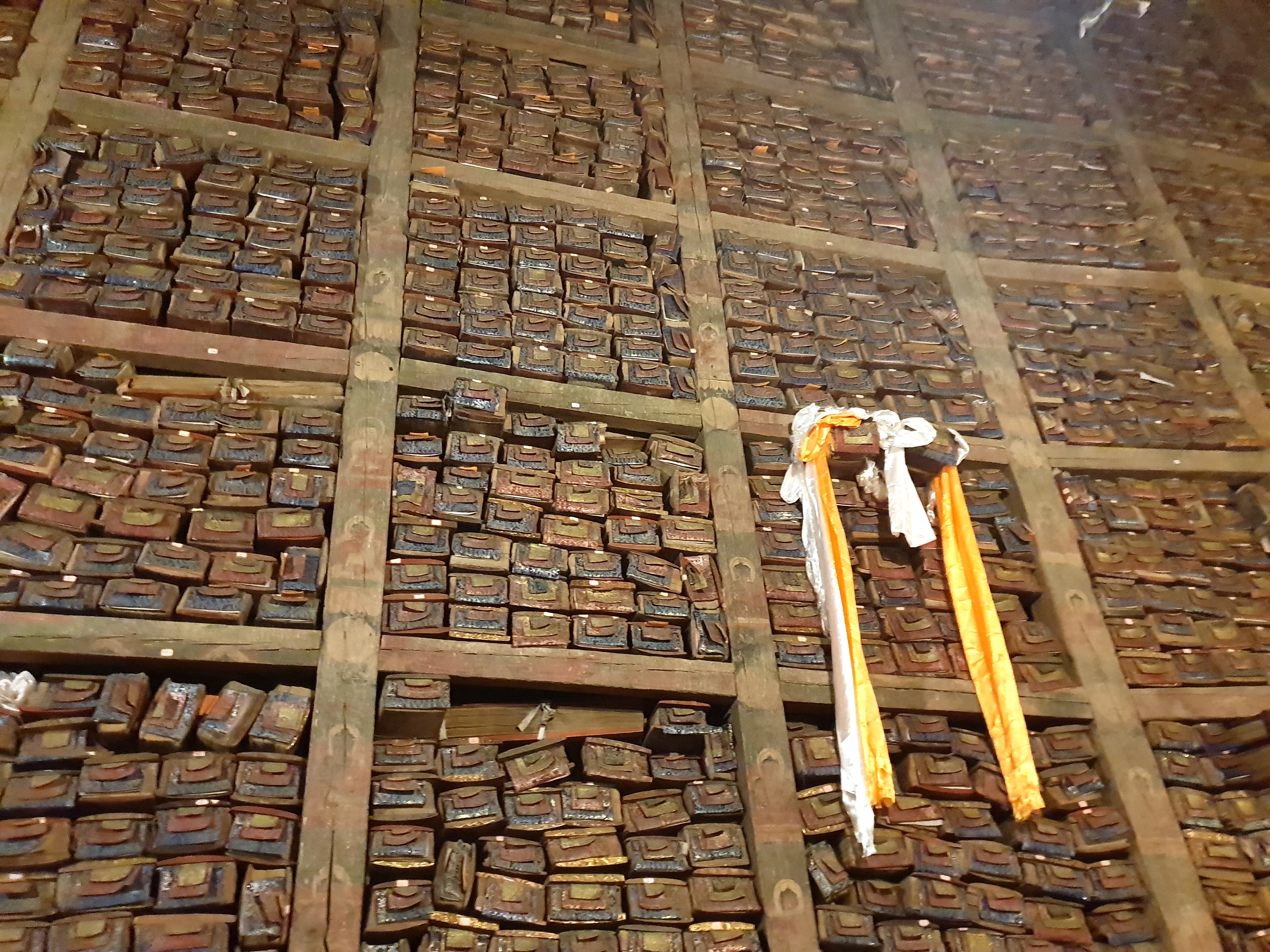

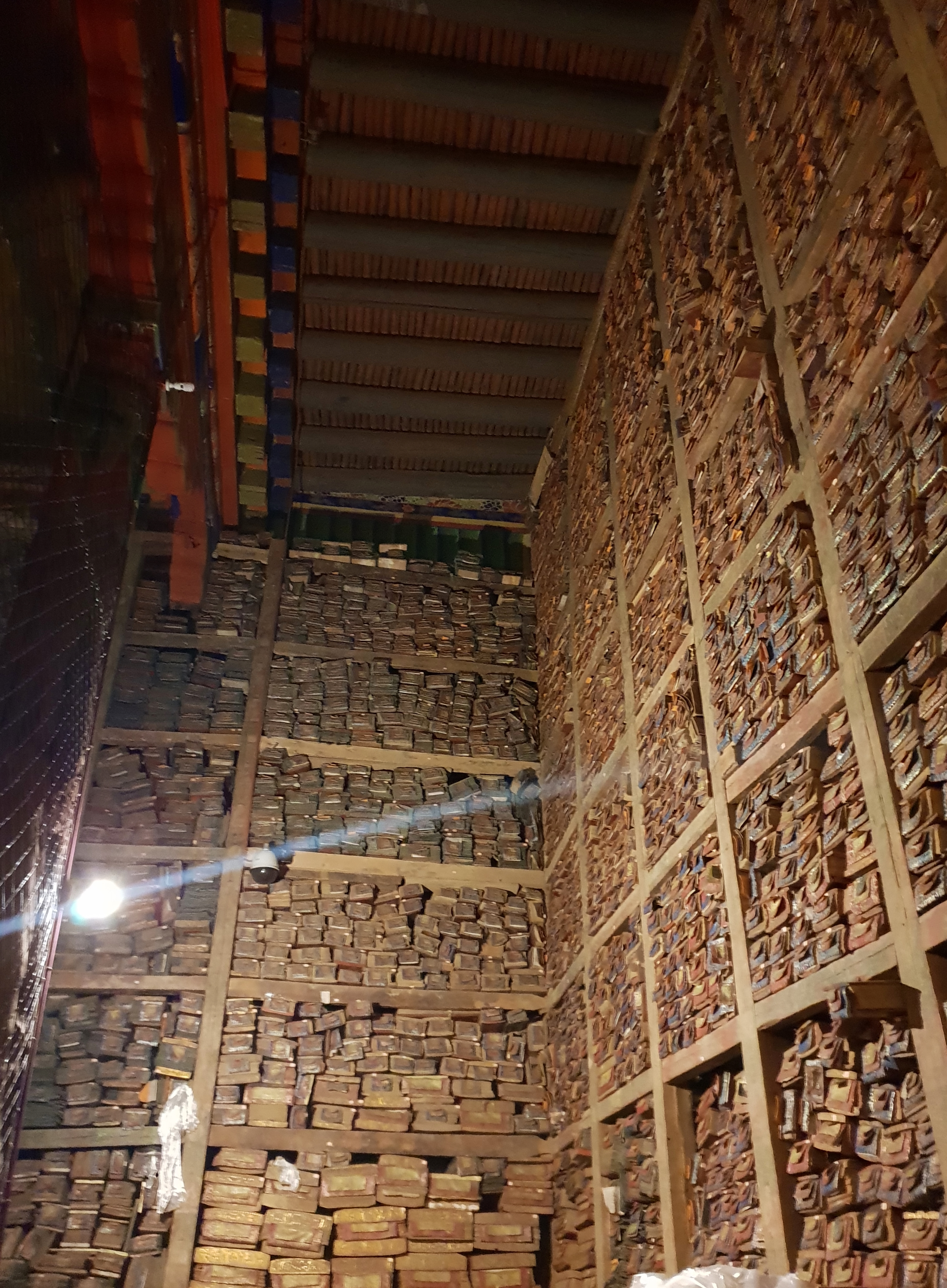

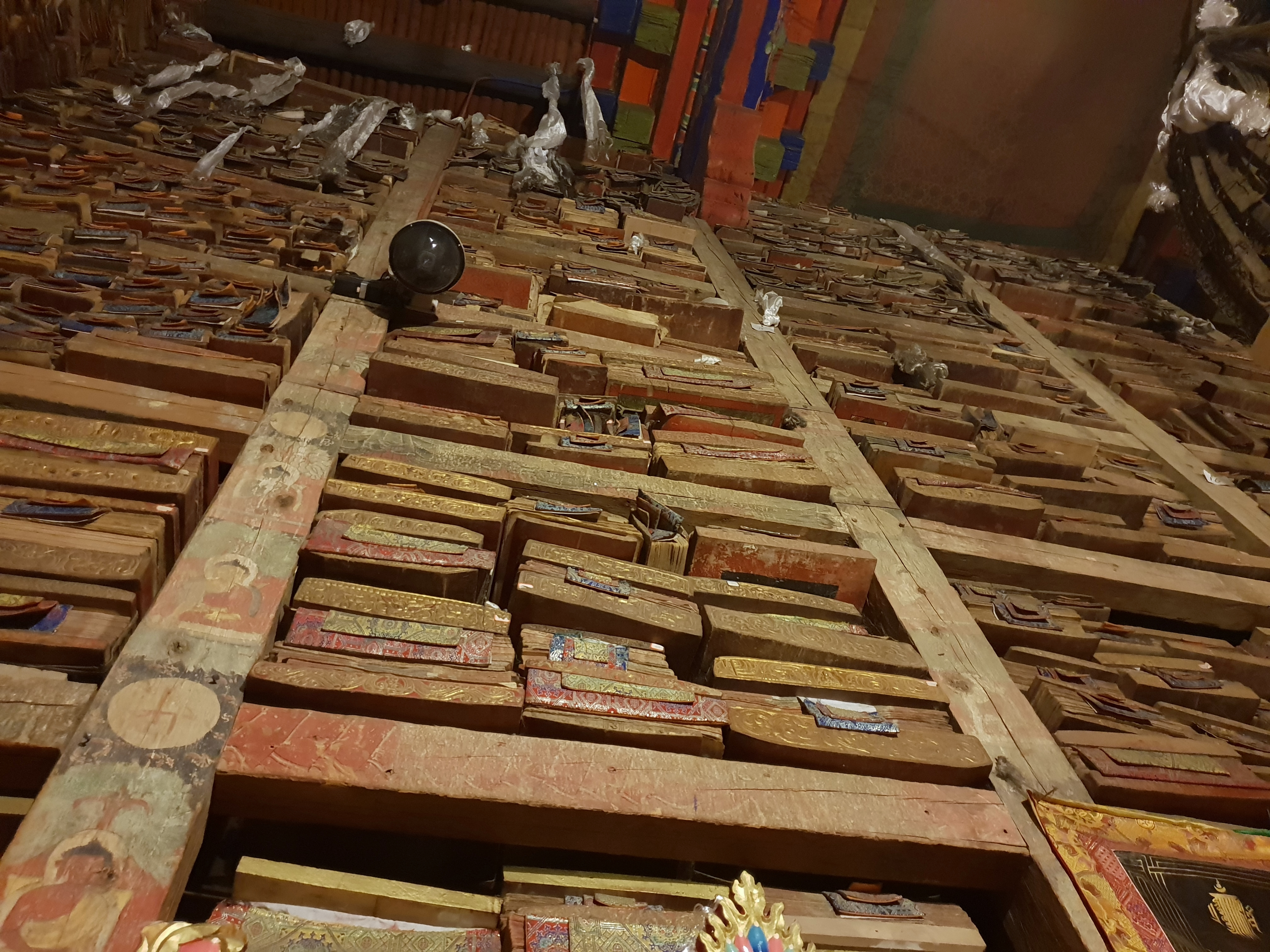

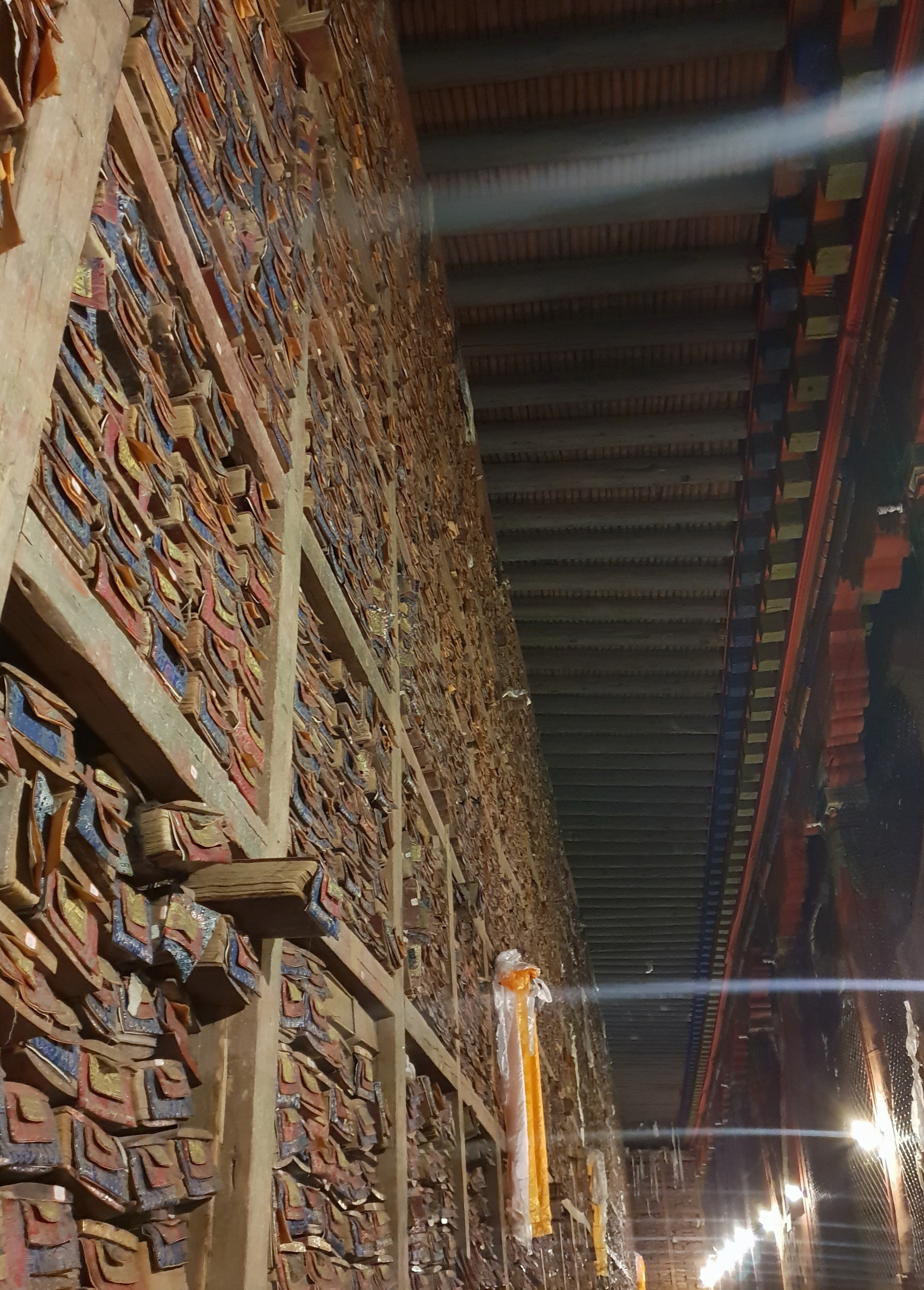

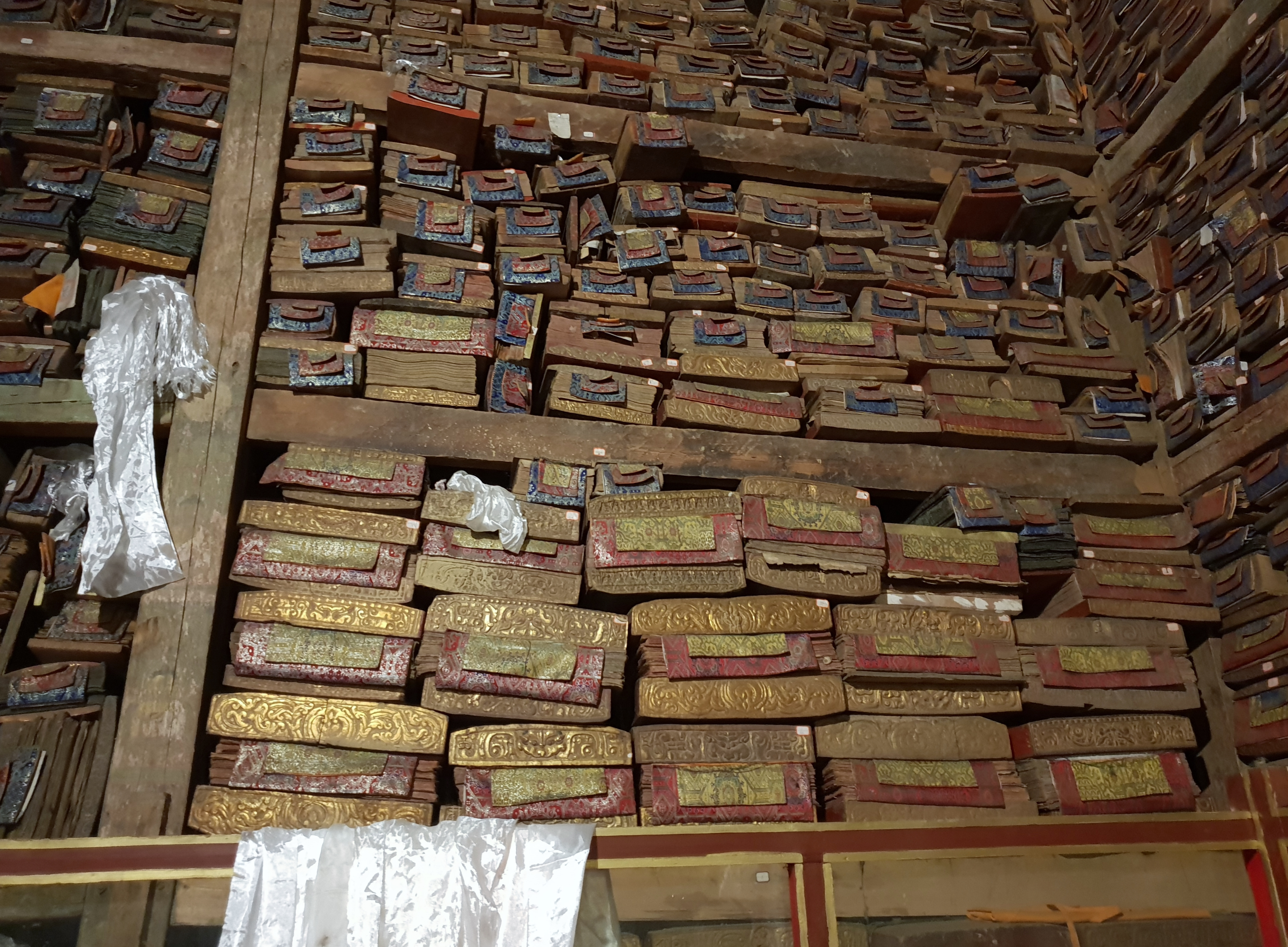

== Sakya Monastery in India ==
The 41st Sakya Trizin, Ngawang Kunga, the then-throne-holder of the Sakyapa, went into exile in India in 1959 following the Chinese invasion of Tibet. He has lived in Dehra Dun, in the foothills of the Western Himalayas, where the Sakya Monastery was reestablished. He has been there with a number of senior monks and scholars, who also escaped from Tibet, joining the new Monastery and providing continuity to Sakya traditions. These monks and scholars saved a number of scrolls from the original Sakya Monastery in Tibet by smuggling them to India. The Sakya Trizin and his followers have established several institutions in and around the Dehradun area, including a charitable hospital, a monastic college, and a nunnery. Being an ancient hereditary lineage, the elder sons of the Sakya school typically married in order to maintain the family line.

The 41st Sakya Trizin, now known as Kyabgon Sakya Gongma Trichen, had taken a consort in 1974 and had two sons who have since assumed responsibility as the 42nd and 43rd Sakya Trizins, respectively. The Sakya Monastery, or Sakya Centre as it is most commonly known, currently has as its Director Ven. Sonam Chogyal and functions under the guidance of Kyabgon Sakya Gongma Trichen Rinpoche and is generally overseen by the 42nd Sakya Trizin, Ratna Vajra Rinpoche, who continues to work on improving and strengthening the monastery in terms of its physical infrastructure, religious activities, and educational programs.
