= Ngor lineage =

Tibetan Buddhist tradition

Ngor is a sub-sect of the Sakya tradition of Tibetan Buddhism. The main monastery of the Ngor sect is the Ngor monastery of Evam Choden about 20 kilometres (12 mi) southwest of Xigazê.

== The Sakya Tradition of Tibetan Buddhism ==
The Sakya tradition is one of the four major religious traditions that existed in Tibet. It rose to play a significant role in the development and spread of the new Tantras that came to Tibet in the 11th century. The origins of the Sakya tradition are closely connected with the ancestral lineage of the Khön family. The lineage of the Khon family can be traced back for thousands of years. The ancestors of the family were heavenly beings who descended directly from the heavenly realms.

In year 1073, a master and member of the Khon family called Khon Konchok Gyalpo established the Sakya School, one of the four schools of Tibetan Buddhism. Since then, successive generations of the Khon family have continued in an unbroken lineage. Many masters have appeared in this Khon lineage, including the five founders of the Sakyapa Order: the Great Sachen Kunga Nyingpo (1092–1158), Loppon Rinpoche Sonam Tsemo (1142–1182), Jetsun Rinpoche Dragpa Gyaltsen (1147–1216), Choje Sakya Pandita (1182–1251) and Drogon Chogyal Phagpa (1235–1280).

Not unlike the other traditions of Tibetan Buddhism, a number of sub traditions gradually emerged within the main Sakya tradition. The lineages of teachings within the discipline instituted by Ngorchen Kunga Zangpo (1382–1457) and the successive masters of this discipline, namely Konchok Lhundrup, Thartse Namkha Palsang and Drubkhang Palden Dhondup have come to be known as the Ngor lineage. The Sakya School of the Khon lineage represents the main trunk of the tree, of which the Ngorpa and Tsarpa are branches. These are the three schools (Sa-Ngor-Tsar-gsum) in the Sakya tradition.

== The Ngor Lineage ==
The two main subschools of the Sakya tradition are the traditions of Ngor and Tsha. The Ngor Monastery was founded in 1429 by the great master Ngorchen Kunga Zangpo (1382–1450). He was born in the water male dog year and trained at Sakya and other monasteries. prophesied by the Buddha, he was a brilliant scholar, teacher and Vajramaster. His primary master was the siddha Buddha Sri, and he was one of the main teachers of Gorampa Sonan Senge.

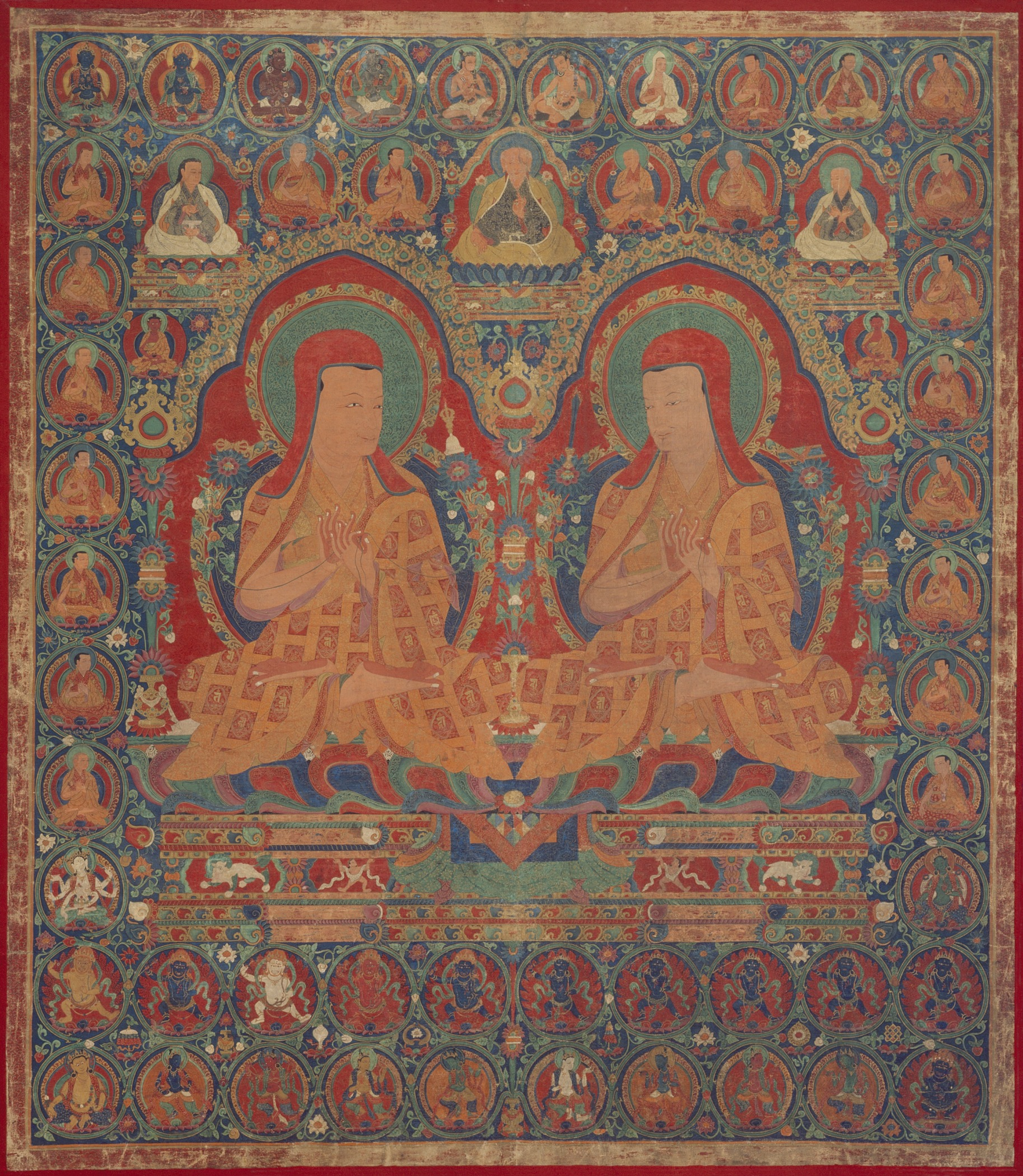
Kunga Wangcuk (1424-1478) and Sonam Senge (1429-1489), The Fourth and Sixth Abbots of Ngor

In 1430, when he was forty-eight years old, Ngorchen founded the main Ngor monastery of Evam Choden near Sakya. Ngor Monastery was named Ngor Ewam Chodan because while it was under construction, Ngorchen Kunga Zangpo dreamt that the collection of all Dharma arises from the letters E and WAM. Ngorchen achieved a very high level of realization and died in the fire malle mouse year, when he was seventy-four.

Ngorchen wrote many important Vajrayana commentaries, and all the main Lamdre teachings passed through him. Other great Ngor masters include Konchod Lundrup, Panchen Ngawang Chodrag; and more recently, Loter Wangpo, who was the main Sakya disciple of Khyentse Wangpo.

After the political difficulties in Tibet in 1959, Ngor Monastery was re-established by the Ngor Abbot H.E Luding Khenchen Jamyang Tenpei Nyima Rinpoche in a forest in Manduwala, Uttarakhand, in Northern India. Through his leadership, the Monastery has fully re-established the performance and training of Monks in all of the annual Drubchot great Vajrayana rituals, has become a popular training school for young Monks, a retreat centre, a library and houses the only Sakya Pandita shrine in India.
