= Kunga Nyingpo =

Kunga Nyingpo (Tib. kun dga’ snying po) may refer to:

- Sachen Kunga Nyingpo (1092–1158)
- Taranatha (1575–1634)
- Kunga Nyingpo (37th Sakya trizin) (1850-1899)
