= Wangdu Nyingpo =

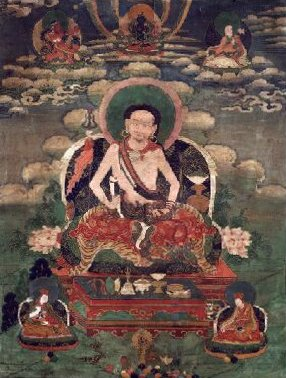

Wangdu Nyingpo, Tuchen (c. 1763 – c. 1806) was a Patriarch of the Khon Family, the 29th Sakya Trizin, and the second Padmasambhava of this age.

His sons were Padma Dudul Wangchug and Kunga Rinchen who founded the present day palaces, the Drolma and Puntsog respectively as these are depicted at the top of the illustration shown above.

Following Wangdu Nyingpo's death around 1806 his small palaces were divided between his sons of the Khon family lineage.
