= Ngorchen Kunga Zangpo =

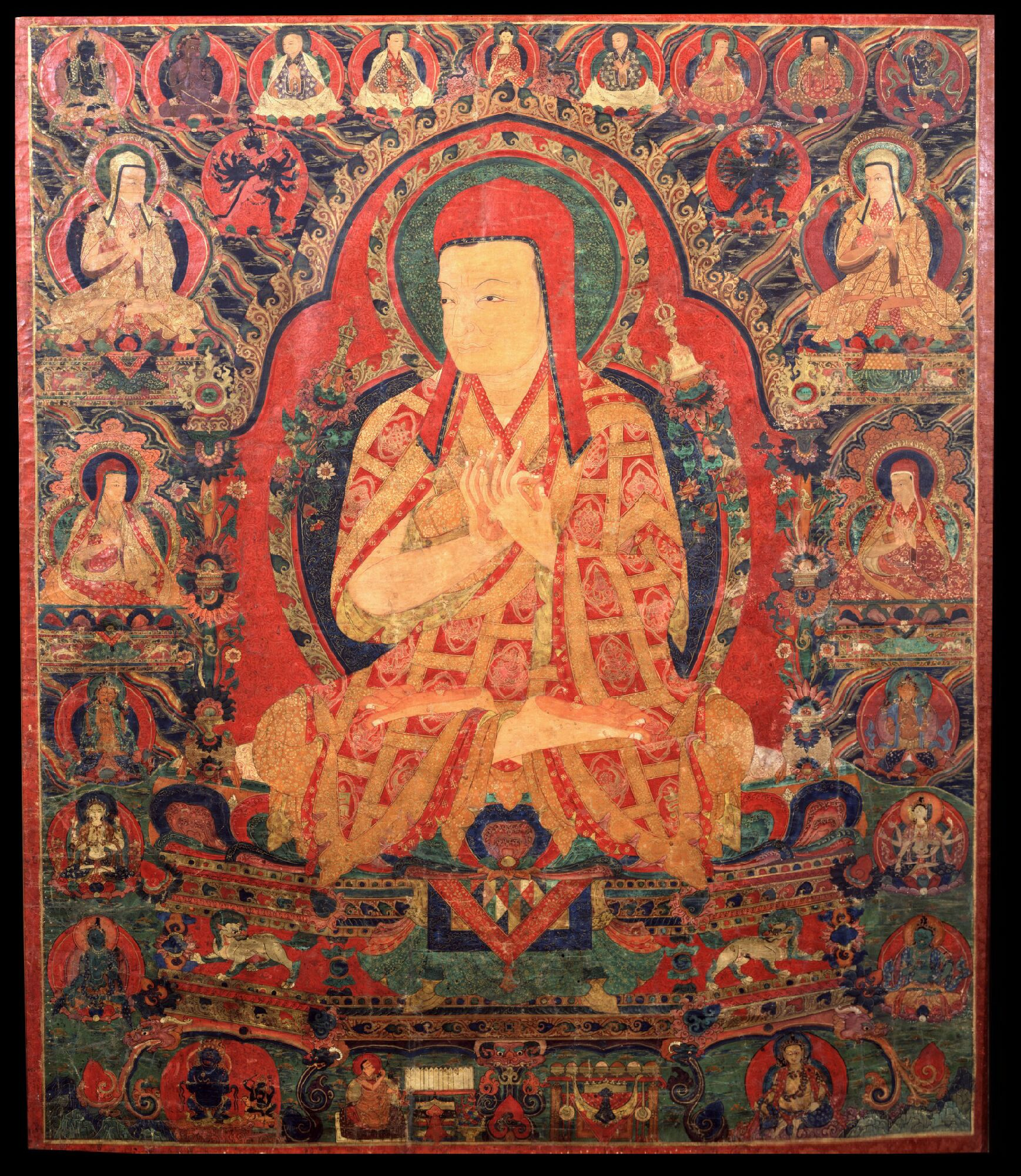
Ngorchen Kunga Zangpo (1382-1456), 1st Ngor Khenchen

Ngorchen Kunga Zangpo (Tibetan: ngor chen kun dga' bzang po; born 1382; died 1456) was a prominent figure in Tibetan Buddhism, belonging to one of the three tantric branches of the Sakya school (tshar pa / ngor pa / gong dkar pa). In 1429, he founded the monastery Ngor Ewaṃ Choden (Ngor E wam chos ldan), the most important site of esoteric Buddhism of the Sakya school in Tsang (Ch. Houzang), the main monastery of the Ngor tradition (ngor lugs). He is recognized as the first throne holder of Ngor Ewaṃ Choden. His collected works contain nearly two hundred titles.

A compilation of collected writings (bka' 'bum) of numerous masters from the Ngor tradition that all served as abbots of Ngor Ewaṃ Choden has been published by the Paltsek Research Institute in the Tibetan book series mes po'i shul bzhag (Chinese: Xianzhe yishu 先哲遗书) under the title E wam bka' 'bum in 20 volumes, starting with Ngorchen Kunga Zangpo.

== See also ==
- Throne holders of Ngor Ewaṃ Choden (in German)

== Bibliography ==
- Jörg Heimbel: Biographical Sources for Researching the Life of Ngor chen Kun dga'bzang po (1382–1456). Revue d'Etudes Tibétaines 2011/11/1
- Zangzu da cidian. Lanzhou, 2004.
