= Sakya Trizin =

Title of the head of the Sakya school

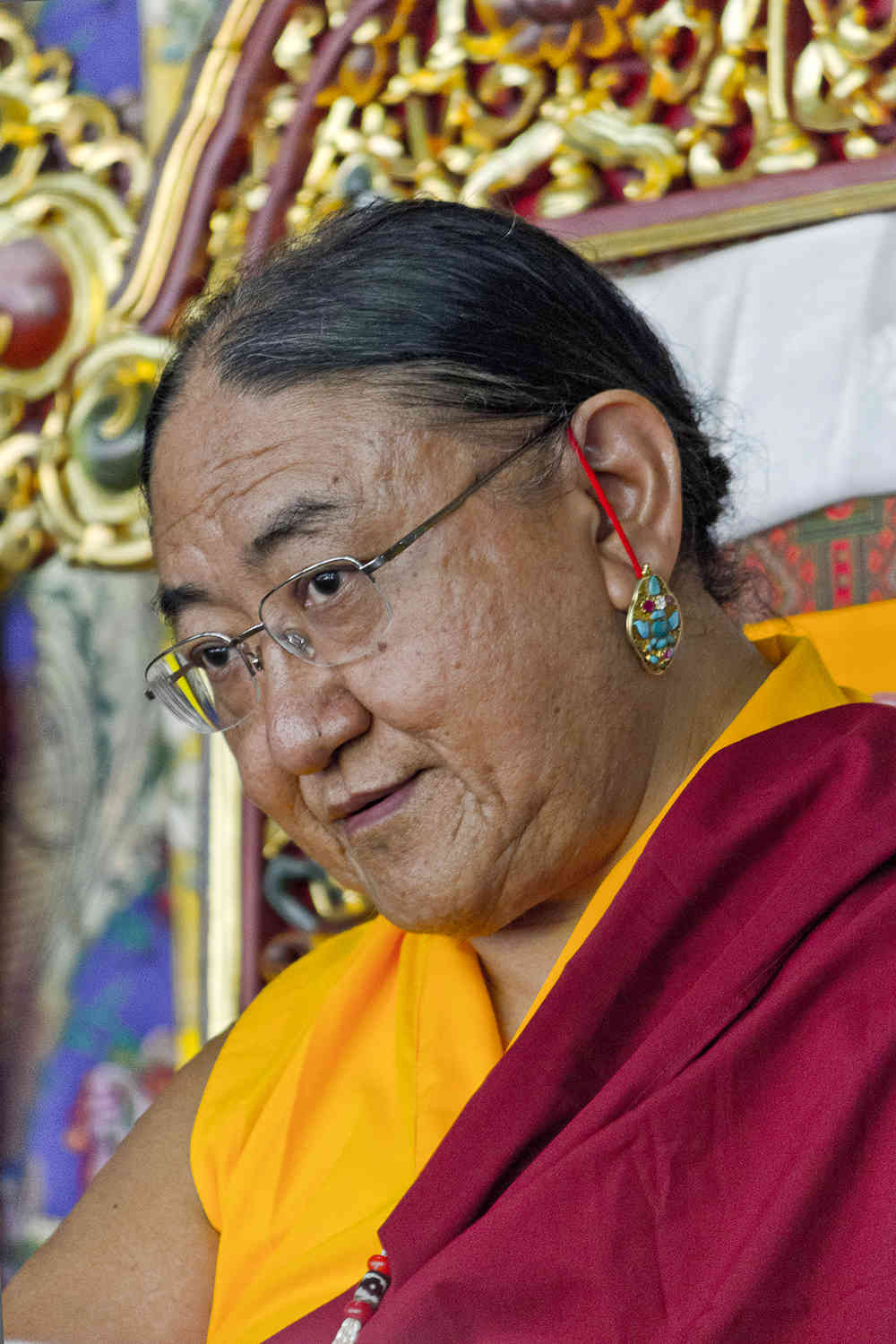
The 41st Sakya Trizin, Sakya Trizin Ngawang Kunga

Sakya Trizin (Tibetan: ས་སྐྱ་ཁྲི་འཛིན།, Wylie: sa skya khri 'dzin "Sakya Throne-Holder") is the traditional title of the head of the Sakya school of Tibetan Buddhism.

The Sakya school was founded in 1073 CE, when Khön Könchog Gyalpo (Tibetan: འཁོན་དཀོན་མཆོག་རྒྱལ་པོ།, Wylie: 'khon dkon mchog rgyal po; 1034–1102), a member of Tibet's noble Khön family, established a monastery in the region of Sakya, Tibet, which became the headquarters of the Sakya order. Since that time, its leadership has descended within the Khön family.

The 41st Sakya Trizin, whose reign spanned more than fifty years, was the longest reigning Sakya Trizin. The current Sakya Trizin is Gyana Vajra Rinpoche, officially known as Kyabgon Gongma Trizin Rinpoche, the 43rd Sakya Trizin Gyana Vajra Rinpoche.

== Origin of Khön ==
Lharig, the divine generation

According to legend Ciring descended from the Rupadhatu (Realm of Clear Light) to earth.

- Ciring
- Yuse
- Yuring
- Masang Cije
- Togsa Pawo Tag
- Tagpo Ochen
- Yapang Kye

Khön family, the royal generation Because previous generations subjugated the rakshasas (demons), the family became the Family of Conquerors (Wylie: khon gyi dung, shortened to Khön) and therefore a royal family.

- Khön Bar Kye
- Khön Jekundag, minister of Trisong Detsen, student of Padmasambhava
- Khön Lu'i Wangpo Srungwa
- Khön Dorje Rinchen
- Khön Sherab Yontan
- Khön Yontan Jungne
- Khön Tsugtor Sherab
- Khön Gekyab
- Khön Getong
- Khön Balpo
- Khön Shakya Lodro
- Sherab Tsultrim

== Sakya Trizin lineage ==
Sakya lineage, generations as Buddhist teachers.

Khon Konchog Gyalpo founded the monastery in Sakya in 1073, and therefore the lineage was renamed Sakya.

	Name	Biographical data	Tenure	Tibetan name
1.	Khon Konchog Gyalpo	1034–1102	1073–1102	Tibetan: འཁོན་དཀོན་མཆོག་རྒྱལ་པོ།, Wylie: khon dkon mchog rgyal po
2.	Rinchen Drag	1040–1111	1103–1110	Tibetan: བ་རི་ལོ་ཙ་བ་རིན་ཆེན་གྲགས།, Wylie: ba ri lo tsa ba rin chen grags
3.	Sachen Kunga Nyingpo	1092–1158	1111–1158	Tibetan: ས་ཆེན་ཀུན་དགའ་སྙིང་པོ།, Wylie: sa chen kun dga’ snying po
4.	Sonam Tsemo	1142–1182	1159–1171	Tibetan: བསོད་ནམས་རྩེ་མོ།, Wylie: bsod nams rtse mo
5.	Dragpa Gyaltsen	1147–1216	1172–1215	Tibetan: རྗེ་བཙུན་རིན་པོ་ཆེ།, Wylie: grags pa rgyal mtshan
6.	Sakya Pandita	1182–1251	1216–1243	Tibetan: ས་སྐྱ་པཎྜི་ཏ་ཀུན་དགའ་རྒྱལ་མཚན།, Wylie: sa skya pandi ta kun dga’ rgyal mtshan
6a.	regent of Sakya Pandita		1243–1264	Tibetan: ས་སྐྱ་པཎྜི་ཏ་ཀུན་དགའ་རྒྱལ་མཚན།, Wylie: sa skya pandi ta kun dga’ rgyal mtshan
7.	Drogön Chögyal Phagpa	1235–1280	1265–1266; 1276–1280	Tibetan: ཆོས་རྒྱལ་འཕགས་པ་བློ་གྲོས་རྒྱལ་མཚན།, Wylie: chos rgyal 'phags pa blo gros rgyal mtshan
8.	Rinchen Gyaltsen	1238–1279	1267–1275	Tibetan: རིན་ཆེན་རྒྱལ་མཚན།, Wylie: rin chen rgyal mtshan
7a.	Drogön Chögyal Phagpa 2nd reign		1276–1280	Tibetan: ཆོས་རྒྱལ་འཕགས་པ་བློ་གྲོས་རྒྱལ་མཚན།, Wylie: chos rgyal 'phags pa blo gros rgyal mtshan
9.	Dharmapala Rakshita	1268–1287	1281–1287	Tibetan: དྷརྨ་པཱ་ལ་རཀཥི་ཏ།, Wylie: d+harma pA la rakaShi ta
10.	Jamyang Rinchen Gyaltsen	1258–1306	1288–1297	Tibetan: ཤར་པ་འཇམ་དབྱངས་རིན་ཆེན་རྒྱལ་མཚན།, Wylie: shar pa 'jam dbyangs rin chen rgyal mtshan
11.	Sangpo Pal	1262–1324	1298–1324	Tibetan: བཟང་པོ་དཔལ།, Wylie: bzang po dpal
12.	Namkha Legpa Gyaltsen	1305–1343	ca. 1324–1342	Tibetan: ནམ་མཁའ་ལེགས་པའི་རྒྱལ་མཚན།, Wylie: nam mkha' legs pa'i rgyal mtshan
13.	Jamyang Donyö Gyaltsen	1310–1344	ca. 1342-1344	Tibetan: འཇམ་དབྱངས་དོན་ཡོད་རྒྱལ་མཚན།, Wylie: 'jam dbyangs don yod rgyal mtshan
14.	Lama Dampa Sönam Gyaltsen	1312–1375	1344–1347	Tibetan: བླ་མ་དམ་པ་བསོད་ནམས་རྒྱལ་མཚན།, Wylie: bla ma dam pa bsod nams rgyal mtshan
15.	Tawen Lodrö Gyaltsen	1332–1364	1347–1364	Tibetan: ཏ་དབེན་བློ་གྲོས་རྒྱལ་མཚན།, Wylie: ta dben blo gros rgyal mtshan
16.	Tawen Kunga Rinchen	1339–1399	ca. 1364-1399	Tibetan: ཏ་དབེན་ཀུན་དགའ་རིན་ཆེན།, Wylie: ta dben kun dga' rin chen
17.	Lopön Chenpo Gushri Lodrö Gyaltsen	1366–1420	1399–1420	Wylie: slob dpon chen po gu shri blo gros rgyal mtshan
18.	Jamyang Namkha Gyaltsen	1398–1472	1421–1441	Wylie: 'jam dbyangs nam mkha' rgyal mtshan
19.	Kunga Wangchuk	1418–1462	1442–1462	Wylie: kun dga' dbang phyug
20.	Gyagar Sherab Gyaltsen	1436–1494	1463–1472	Wylie: rgya gar ba shes rab rgyal mtshan
21.	Dagchen Lodrö Gyaltsen	1444–1495	1473–1495	Wylie: bdag chen blo gros rgyal mtshan
22.	Kunga Sönam	1485–1533	1496–1533	Wylie: sa skya lo tsa ba kun dga' bsod nams
23.	Ngagchang Kunga Rinchen	1517–1584	1534–1584	Wylie: sngags 'chang kun 'dga rin chen
24.	Jamyang Sönam Sangpo	1519–1621	1584–1589	Wylie: 'jam dbyangs bsod nams bzang po
25.	Dragpa Lodrö	1563–1617	1589–1617	Wylie: grags pa blo gros
26.	Ngawang Kunga Wangyal	1592–1620	1618–1620	Wylie: ngag dbang kun dga' dbang rgyal
27.	Ngawang Kunga Sönam	1597–1659	1620–1659	Wylie: ngag dbang kun dga' bsod nams
28.	Ngawang Sönam Wangchuk	1638–1685	1659–1685	Wylie: ngag dbang bsod nams dbang phyug
29.	Ngawang Kunga Tashi	1656–1711	1685–1711	Wylie: ngag dbang kun dga' bkra shis
30.	Sönam Rinchen	1705–1741	1711–1741	Wylie: bsod nams rin chen
31.	Kunga Lodrö	1729–1783	1741–1783	Wylie: kun dga' blo gros
32.	Wangdu Nyingpo	1763–1809	1783–1806	Wylie: dbang sdud snying po
33.	Pema Dudul Wangchuk	1792–1853	1806–1843	Wylie: pad ma bdud 'dul dbang phyug
34.	Dorje Rinchen	1819–1867	1843–1845	Wylie: rdo rje rin chen
35.	Tashi Rinchen	1824–1865	1846–1865	Wylie: bkra shis rin chen
36.	Kunga Sönam	1842–1882	1866–1882	Wylie: kun dga' bsod nams
37.	Kunga Nyingpo	1850–1899	1883–1899	Wylie: kun dga' snying po
38.	Dzamling Chegu Wangdu	1855–1919	1901–1915	Wylie: 'dzam gling che rgu dbang 'dud
39.	Dragshul Trinle Rinchen	1871–1936	1915–1936	Tibetan: དྲག་ཤུལ་འཕྲིན་ལས་རིན་ཆེན།, Wylie: drag shul 'phrin las rin chen, ZWPY: Chagxü Chinlä Rinqên
40.	Ngawang Thutob Wangdrag	1900–1950	1937–1950	Tibetan: ངག་དབང་མཐུ་སྟོབས་དབང་དྲག, Wylie: ngag dbang mthu stobs dbang drag
41.	Ngawang Kunga Tegchen Palbar *see Sakya Trizin Ngawang Kunga	* 1945	1951–2017	Tibetan: ངག་དབང་ཀུན་དགའ་ཐེག་ཆེན་དཔལ་འབར་འཕྲིན་ལས་བསམ་འཕེལ་དབང་གྱི་རྒྱལ་པོ།, Wylie: ngag dbang kun dga' theg chen dpal 'bar trin lé sam pel wang gyi gyel po
42.	Ratna Vajra Rinpoche	* 1974	2017–2022	Tibetan: ངག་དབང་ཀུན་དགའ་བློ་གྲོས་དབང་ཕྱུག་རིན་ཆེན་འཇིགས་མེད་འཕྲིན་ལས།, Wylie: nNgag dBang Kun dGa' Blo Gros Rin Chen 'Jigs Med 'Phrin Las
43.	Gyana Vajra Rinpoche	1979	2022–present	Tibetan: ཀུན་དགའ་རིན་ཆེན་མཁྱེན་བརྩེ་རྡོ་རྗེ།, Wylie: Kun dGa' Rin Chen mKhyen brTse rDo rJe

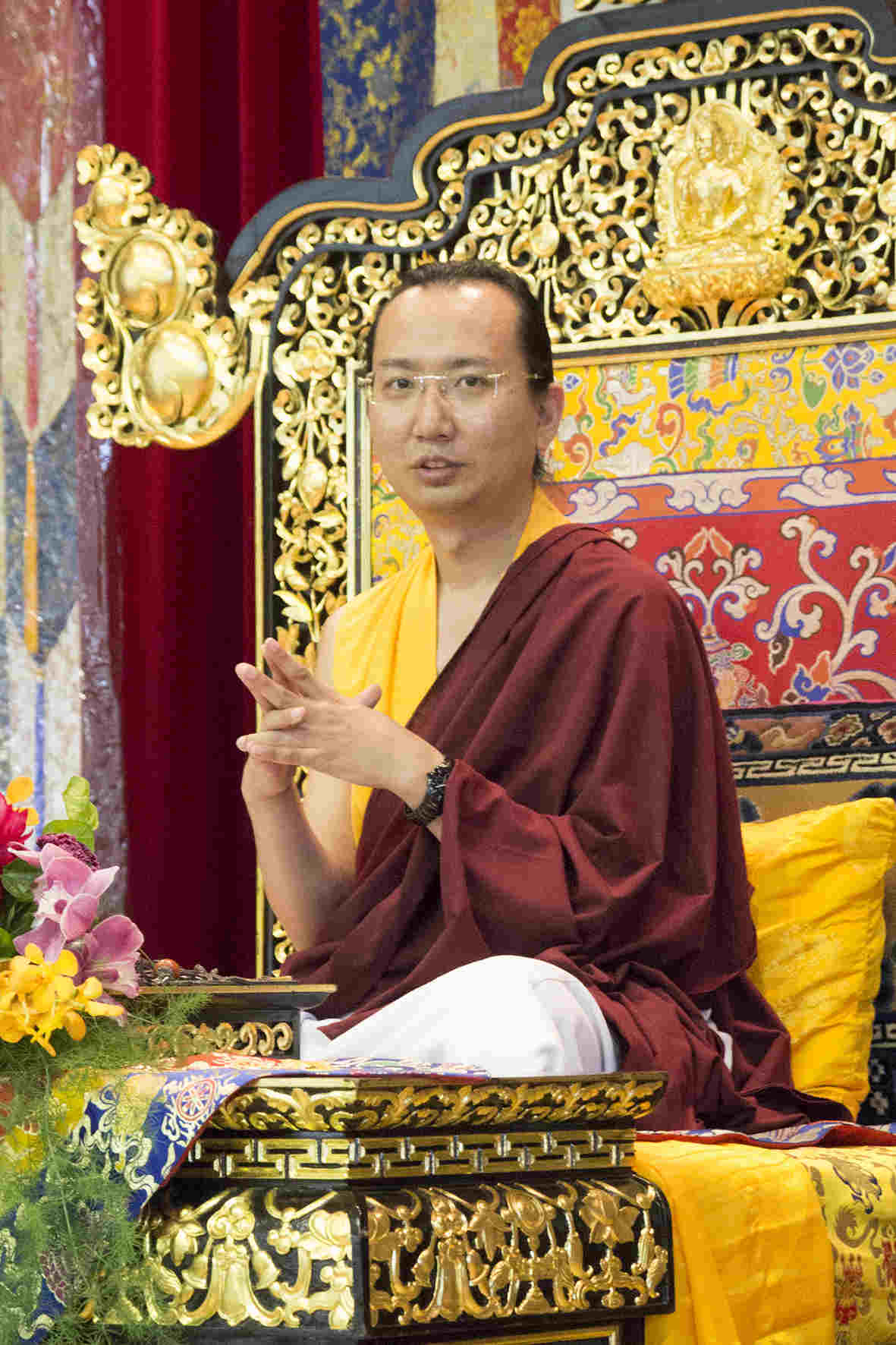
The 42nd Sakya Trizin, Ratna Vajra Rinpoche, The first to be enthroned under the new system

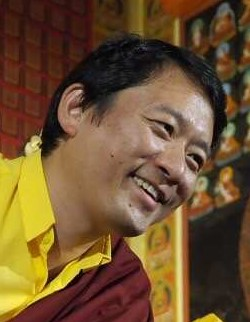
The 43rd Sakya Trizin, Gyana Vajra Rinpoche

== New succession system ==
On 11 December 2014, a new throne holder succession system was announced during the 23rd Great Sakya Mönlam prayer festival on a resolution passed by the Dolma Phodrang and Phuntsok Phodrang, where members of both Phodrang will serve the role of Sakya Trizin in one three-year term, according to their seniority and qualification.

Ratna Vajra Rinpoche was enthroned on 9 March 2017 as the 42nd Sakya Trizin, the first to be enthroned under the new system. Due to the COVID Pandemic, the 43rd Sakya Trizin Gyana Vajra Rinpoche was enthroned on 16 March 2022, five years after the enthronement of the 42nd Sakya Trizin. He is the current throne holder of the Sakya school.
