= Ngorchen Konchog Lhundrup =

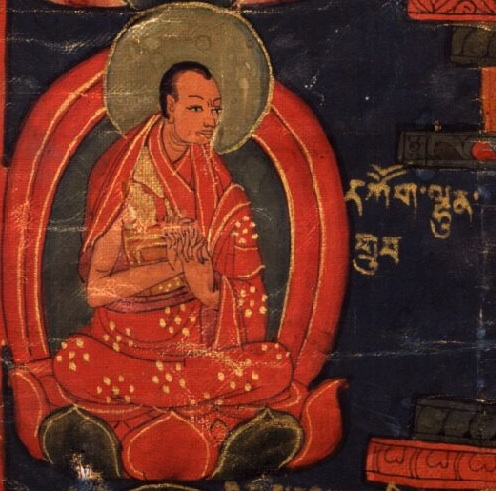

Ngorchen Konchog Lhundrub (born 1497 in Sakya - died 1557) was a Tibetan Buddhist monk, abbot, teacher and writer.

He entered monastic life at the age of 13, when he began his Buddhist studies. He received the Sakya Tibetan Buddhism teachings from his main teachers as well as other Sutra and tantra teachings. After participating in many meditation retreats, he developed a Lamdré view called the non-differentiation of worldly existence and liberation. He was able to conduct his daily life in accordance with this philosophical view of reality, and all his activities were pure. Ngorchen Konchog Lhundrub maintained a strict Vinaya discipline, and was also a pure vegetarian.

At the age of 38 he became the tenth abbot of Ngor Ewam Choden monastery, and was the abbott for 24 years. During this time he bestowed the Lamdré teachings 35 times, as well as giving other instructions on Sutra and Tantra. He was also a very prolific writer. He died in 1557.

== Main teachers ==
- Konchog Phel (dkon mchog 'phel)
- Muchen Sangye Rinchen (mu chen sangs rgyas rin chen)
- Salo Jampa'i Dorje (sa lo 'jam pa'i rdo rje)
