= Khön Könchok Gyalpo =

Tibetan religious founder

Khön Könchok Gyalpo (Tibetan: འཁོན་དཀོན་མཆོག་རྒྱལ་པོ་, Wylie: 'khon dkon mchog rgyal po, 1034-1102) was the founder of the Sakya School of Tibetan Buddhism, and the founder of Sakya Monastery. Khön Könchok Gyalpo was born in Sa'gya, Tsang. He was a member of the Khön family, and his ancestry can be traced back to Khön Dorje Rinpoche, student of Padmasambhava. He followed his father and brother and learned doctrines of the Nyingma School at a young age, but studied newly translated Vajrayāna texts with Drogmi Shakya Yeshe later. Khön Könchok Gyalpo established Sakya Monastery in 1073, where the Sakya Tradition first developed. His son Khön Kunga Nyingpo was regarded as the first leader of Sakya, and Khön Könchok Gyalpo is known as the first Sakya Trizin.
