= Sakya Trizin Ngawang Kunga =

41st Sakya Trizin

Ngawang Kunga, Sakya Trizin Emeritus
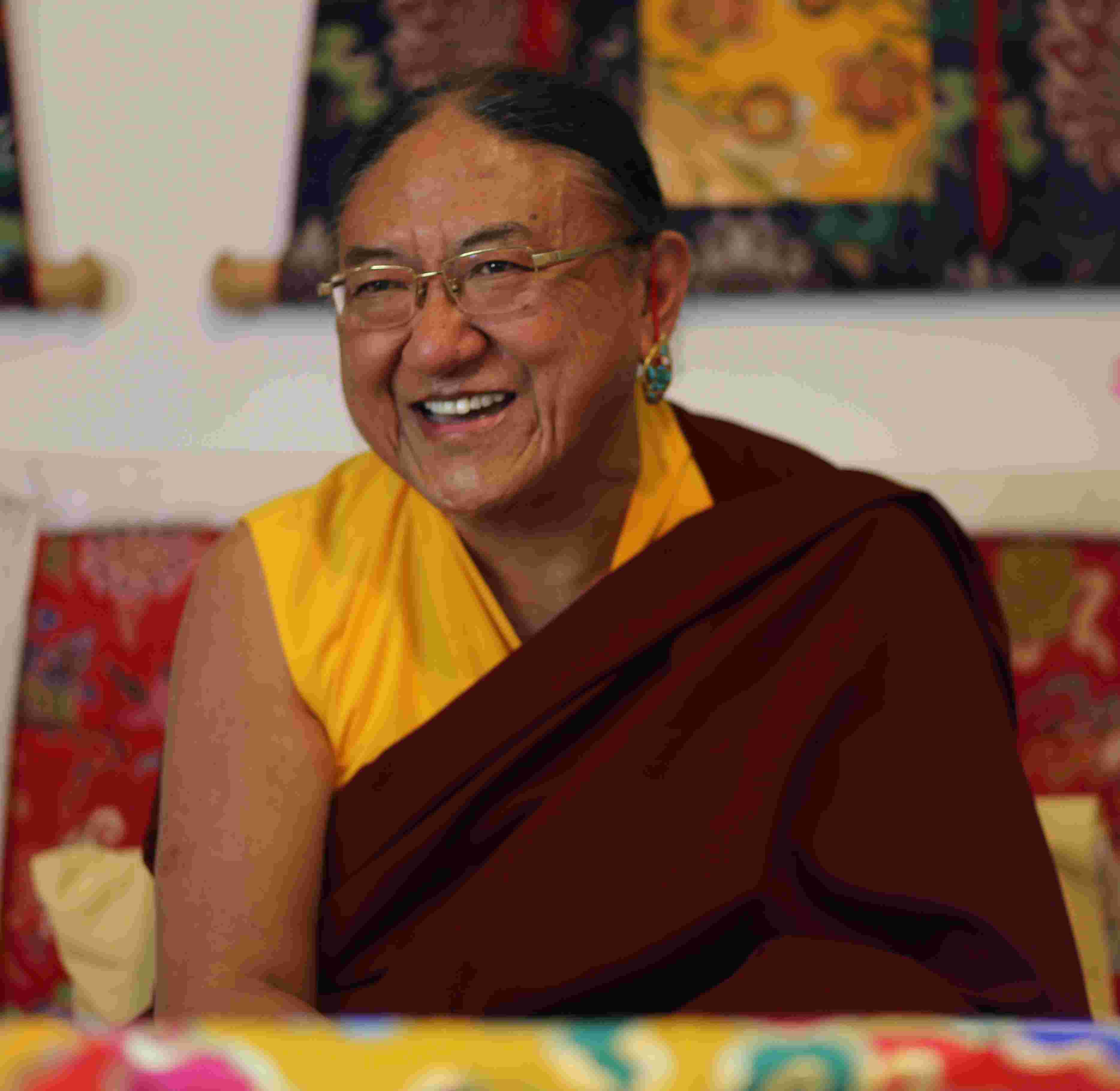
- Title: His Holiness the 41st Sakya Trizin Kyabgon Gongma Trichen Rinpoche

Personal life
- Born: Ngawang Kunga; September 7, 1945 (age 80) Tsedong, Tibet
- Spouse: Gyalyum Tashi Lhakee
- Children: Ratna Vajra Rinpoche, Gyana Vajra Rinpoche

Religious life
- Religion: Buddhism
- School: Sakya school of Tibetan Buddhism

Sakya Trizin Ngawang Kunga served as the 41st Sakya Trizin, the throne holder of the Sakya Lineage of Tibetan Buddhism, from his appointment in 1952 until his retirement in 2017. His religious name is Ngawang Kunga Tegchen Palbar Trinley Samphel Wangyi Gyalpo (Tibetan: ངག་དབང་ཀུན་དགའ་ཐེག་ཆེན་དཔལ་འབར་འཕྲིན་ལས་བསམ་འཕེལ་དབང་གྱི་རྒྱལ་པོ།, Wylie: ngag dbang kun dga' theg chen dpal 'bar 'phrin las bsam 'phel dbang gyi rgyal po). After passing the throne of the Sakya lineage to his elder son Ratna Vajra Rinpoche who became the 42nd Sakya Trizin on 9 March 2017, he is now known as Kyabgon Gongma Trichen Rinpoche.

== Biography ==
Ngawang Kunga was born on September 7, 1945 in Tsedong, near Shigatse, Tibet. From his father, Vajradhara Ngawang Kunga Rinchen, he received important initiations and teachings in the Sakya lineage. He began intensive religious study at the age of five. In 1952, he was officially designated as the next Sakya Trizin by the Fourteenth Dalai Lama. He continued intensive training from his main teacher Ngawang Lodroe Shenpen Nyingpo and many other famous Tibetan scholars, studying extensively in both the esoteric and exoteric Buddhist traditions. In 1959, at the age of fourteen, he was formally enthroned as head of the Sakya Order of Tibetan Buddhism. In the same year, due to the violent take over by China and the ensuing political situation in Tibet, Sakya Trizin Ngawang Kunga, his family, and many lamas and monks from the Sakya Monastery relocated to India.

To maintain the unbroken lineage of the Khon family, in 1974 he consented to requests that he accept Tashi Lhakee, daughter of a noble family from Derge in Kham as his consort. In the same year his first son, Ratna Vajra Rinpoche, was born. In 1979, a second son, Gyana Vajra Rinpoche was born.

After leaving Tibet, in 1964, Ngawang Kunga re-established the seat of the Sakya in Rajpur, India, building a monastery known as Sakya Centre. Since that time, he has worked tirelessly to preserve the thousand-year-old religious heritage of the Sakya Order and to transmit its teachings to succeeding generations. He founded and directly guides a number of institutions, including Sakya Monastery in Rajpur, Sakya Institute, Sakya College, Sakya Nunnery, Sakya College for Nuns, Sakya Tibetan Settlement, Sakya Hospital, dozens of other monasteries and nunneries in Tibet, Nepal, and India, and numerous Dharma Centers in many countries.

Ngawang Kunga is a Buddhist lineage holder who teaches throughout the world. He has trained both of his sons as Buddhists, and they both travel widely, teaching Buddhism throughout the world.

The year 2009 marked the fiftieth anniversary of the 41st Sakya Trizin's leadership of the Sakya Order. The occasion was celebrated as a Golden Jubilee with extensive celebrations and tributes to his success in preserving and maintaining the Sakya school.

== Bibliography ==
- Penny-Dimri, Sandra. (1995). "The Lineage of His Holiness Sakya Trizin Ngawang Kunga." The Tibet Journal. Vol. XX, No. 4 Winter 1995, pp. 64–92. ISSN 0970-5368.
- Trizin, Sakya. Parting from the Four Attachments. Shang Shung Publications, 1999.
- Johnson, Sandy. The Book of Tibetan Elders: Life Stories and Wisdom from the Great Spiritual Masters of Tibet. New York: Riverhead Books, 1997. ISBN 9781573226073
