= Ratna Vajra Rinpoche =

42nd Sakya Trizin

Ratna Vajra Rinpoche the 42nd Sakya Trizin
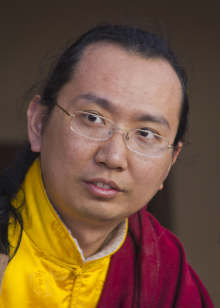
- Title: Kyabgon Gongma Trizin Rinpoche, the 42nd Sakya Trizin Ratna Vajra Rinpoche

Personal life
- Born: 19 November 1974 (age 51) Dehra Dun, India
- Spouse: Dagmo Kalden Dunkyi
- Children: Jetsunma Kunga Trinley Palter Sakya, Dungsay Akasha Vajra Rinpoche, Jetsunma Kunga Chimey Wangmo Sakya
- Education: Sakya College

Religious life
- Religion: Tibetan Buddhism
- School: Sakya

Senior posting
- Teacher: 41st Sakya Trizin, Chogye Trichen Rinpoche, 14th Dalai Lama, Luding Khenchen Rinpoche, Dezhung Rinpoche

Ratna Vajra Rinpoche (born 19 November 1974), is a Tibetan Buddhist teacher who served as the 42nd Sakya Trizin from 2017 to 2022, considered one of the highest qualified lineage masters of both the esoteric and exoteric traditions of Buddhist philosophy and meditation. He is a descendant of the famous Khön family in Tibet, which holds an unbroken lineage of great and famous masters for over a thousand years. He is the eldest son of the 41st Sakya Trizin Ngawang Kunga. He teaches Buddhism and travels extensively throughout Europe, Asia, Australia, New Zealand and North America. Ratna Vajra was enthroned as the head of the Sakya school on 9 March 2017. On 16 March 2022, the throne of the Sakya school was passed by Ratna Vajra to his younger brother Gyana Vajra, who became the 43rd Sakya Trizin.

== Education ==
From birth, Rinpoche has been the recipient of blessings, empowerments, initiations and teachings from many of the foremost high lamas and scholars of this age. Most of these were bestowed by the 41st Sakya Trizin and others were bestowed by the 14th Dalai Lama, Chogye Trichen Rinpoche (1920–2007), Luding Khenchen Rinpoche and Dezhung Rinpoche (1906–1987). In addition to receiving many empowerments and teachings from the Sakya Trizin, he learned many facets of traditional rituals from him also.

On the 14th day of the 11th Tibetan lunar month, the anniversary of Sakya Pandita (20 December 1980), he began to receive the cycle of the precious uncommon Lam Dre teachings from the Sakya Trizin for the first time at Sakya Thubten Namgyal Ling monastery in Puruwala, India.

At the age of six, he started his formal education under the tutorship of Venerable Rinchen Sangpo. He took his first oral examination on 10 October 1981 in the presence of his tutor Sakya Trizin and prominent members of the Sakya Centre on The Remembrance of the Triple Gem, The Three Heap Sutra, The Confession Sutra, the extended lineage Guru's prayers and several other texts. Since then, he has taken many oral examinations, including the examinations in which he had to lead special rituals in the Sakya Centre. In 1986 he performed his first meditation retreat together with his mother, Gyalyum Kushok Tashi Lhakee.

In 1987, when Rinpoche was fourteen, he passed his first major examination at the Sakya Centre, Rajpur, India. Two years later, he completed all his basic studies of different rituals and scriptures. The following year, he entered the Sakya College and studied there for seven years. During that time, he studied Buddhist philosophy mainly under Khenpo Ngawang Lekshey Kunga Rinpoche (aka. Khenpo Migmar Tsering. 1955–1999). In 1998, he graduated with a Kachupa Degree, which is equivalent to a Bachelor's Degree.

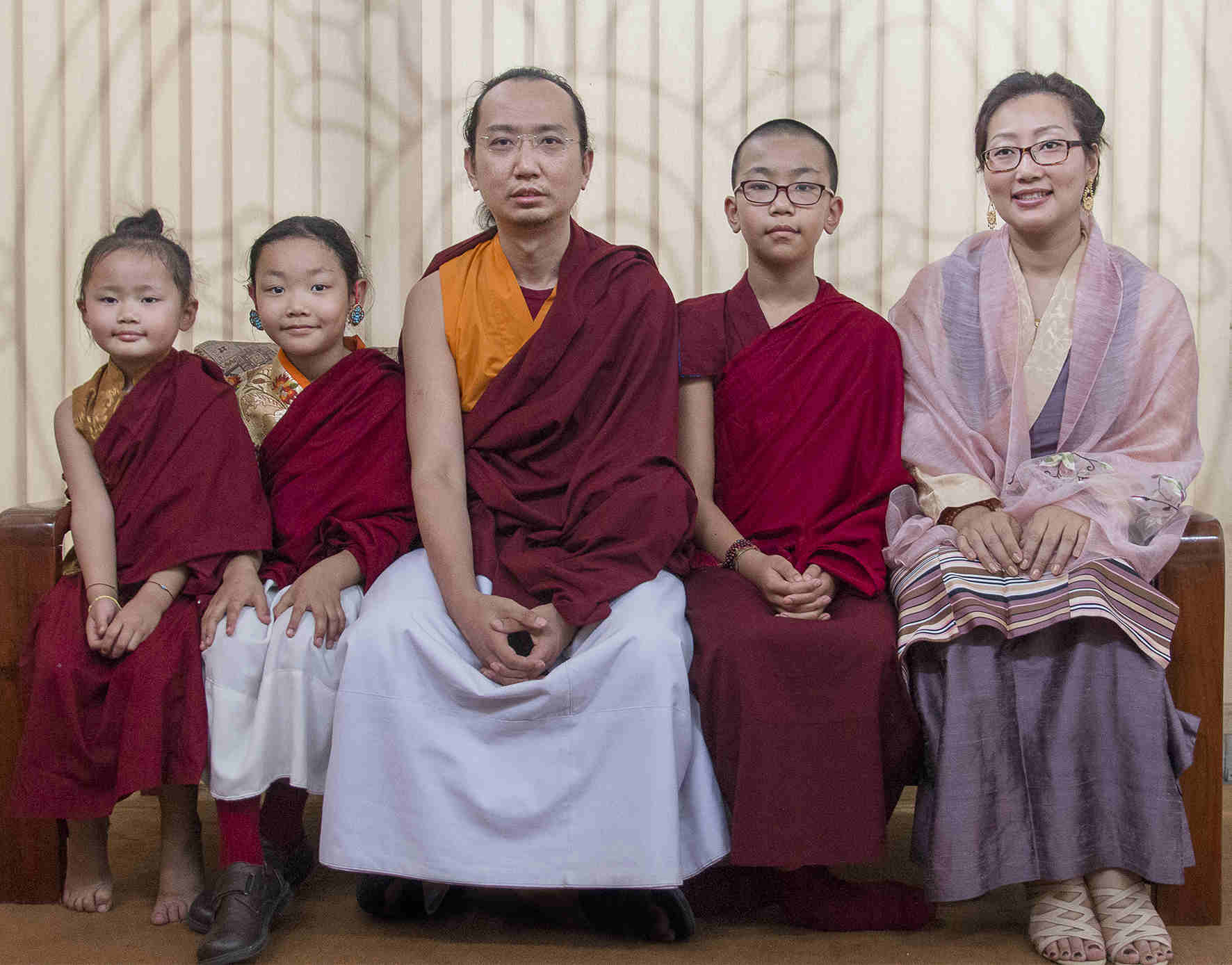
Ratna Vajra Rinpoche with family

From his adolescent years to adulthood, Rinpoche has sought and received numerous teachings from the great Sakya scholars including Khenchen Appey Rinpoche (1927–2010), Khenpo Kunga Wangchuk Rinpoche (1921–2008) and Khenpo Lungrik Senge. He has also completed many retreats on the principal deities of the Sakya tradition.

== Family ==
On 12 September 2002, Ratna Vajra Rinpoche married Dagmo Kalden Dunkyi. Their first child, daughter Jetsunma Kunga Trinley Palter Sakya was born on 2 January 2007, the Parinirvana Day of Sakya Pandita, which is considered auspicious according to Tibetan custom.

Their son, Dungsay Akasha Vajra Rinpoche, was born on 27 March 2010, the 12th day of the 2nd month of the Tibetan calendar, the anniversary of the Paranirvana of Jetsun Drakpa Gyaltsen. His birth was accompanied by a slight earthquake in New Delhi where he was born. Such an event is considered an auspicious sign according to Tibetan belief. It portends that a great being has entered this world. On 24 January 2013 their second daughter, Jetsunma Kunga Chimey Wangmo Sakya, was born in Dehra Dun, India.

Ratna Vajra Rinpoche oversees the management of many Sakya monasteries and Sakya centers throughout the world.
