= Sonam Tsemo =

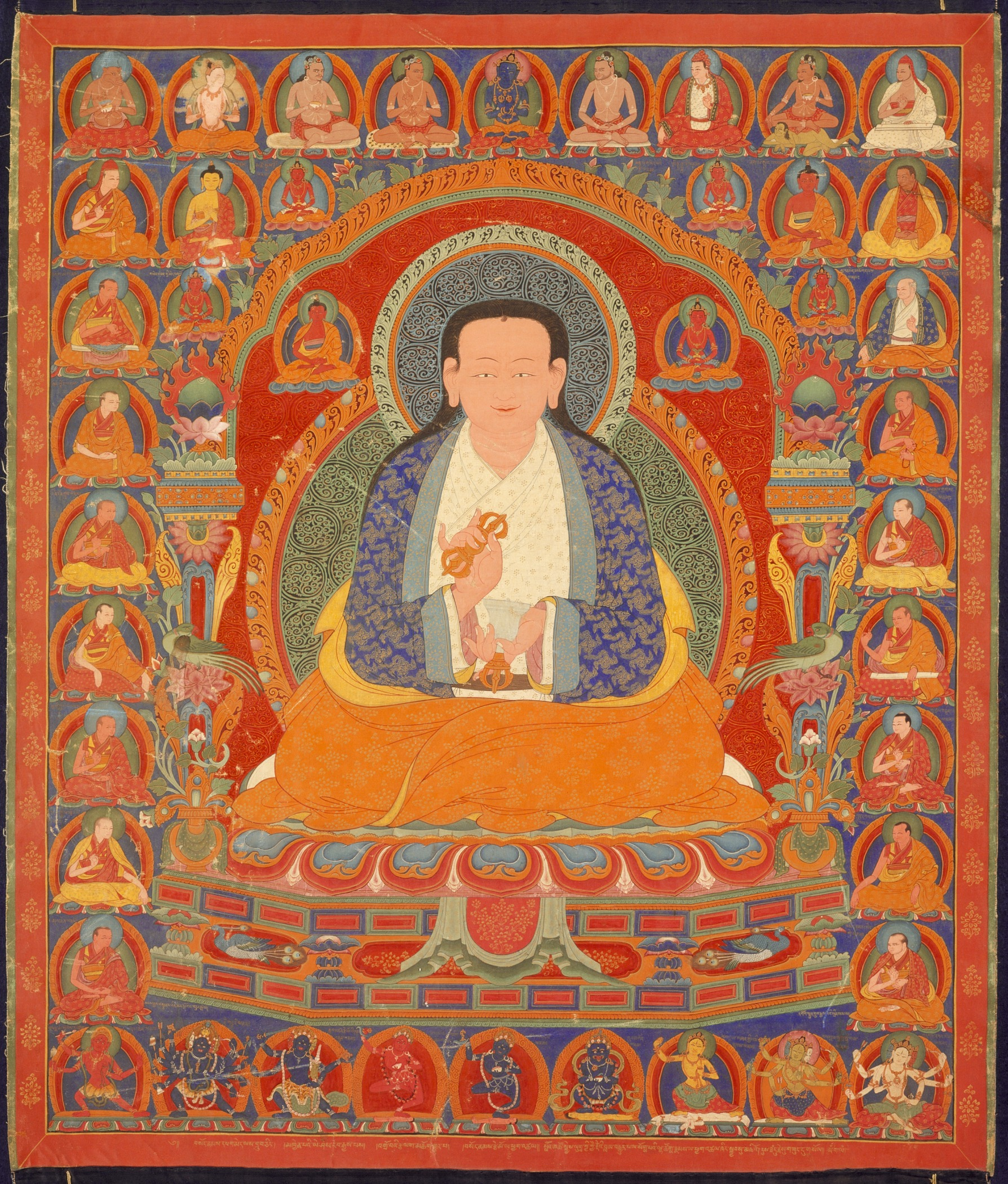
Sonam Tsemo and his lineage, 17th-century painting from Ngor Monastery

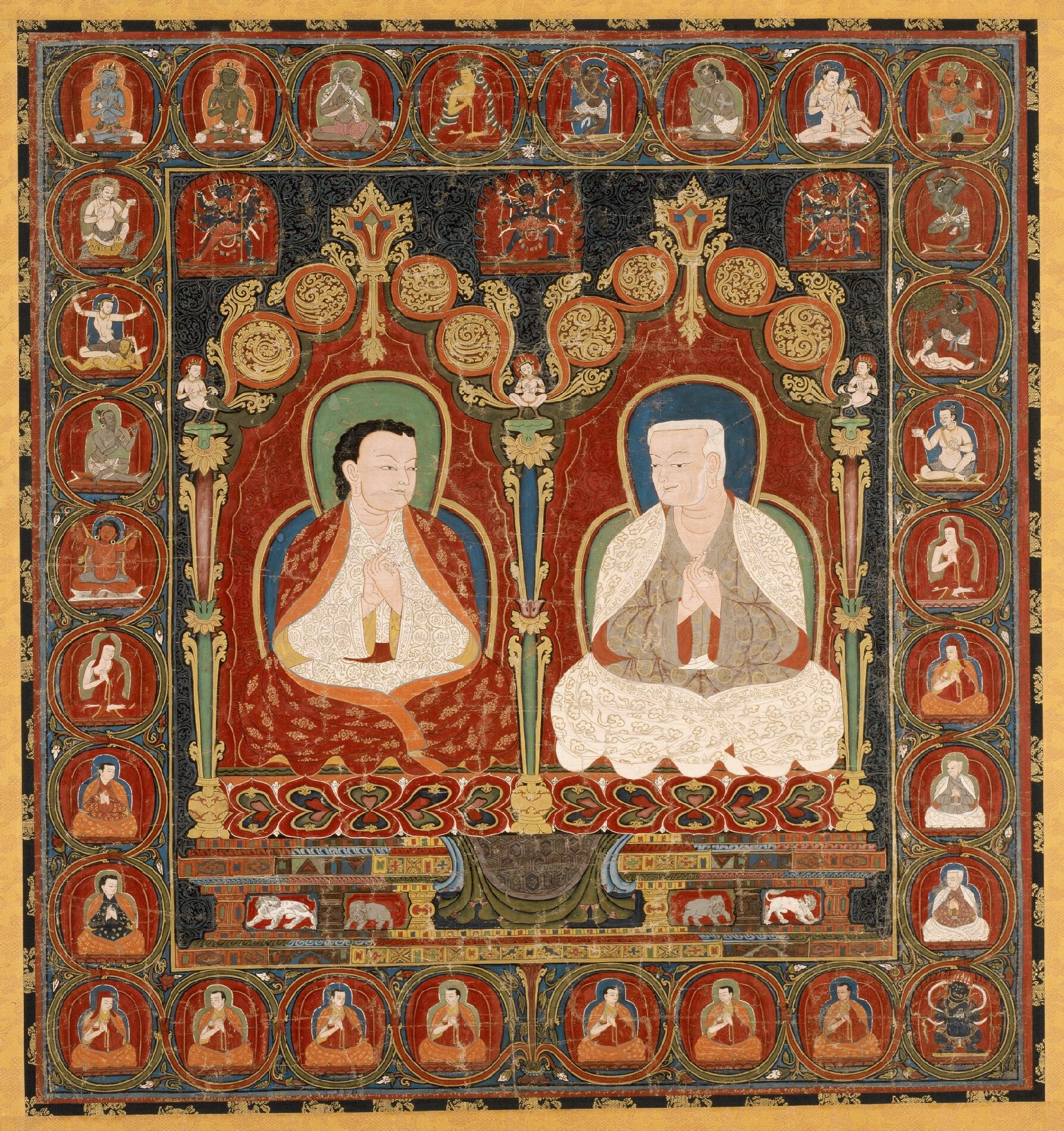
Teacher (Lama) Sonam Tsemo, 6th-century painting, Boston Museum of Fine Art

Sonam Tsemo (Tibetan: བསོད་ནམས་རྩེ་མོ།, Wylie: bsod nams rtse mo, THL: sönam tsemo; 1142–1182) (or Lobpon Rinpoche Sonam Tsemo), an important Tibetan sprititual leader and Buddhist scholar, was the second of the so-called Five Venerable Supreme Sakya Masters of Tibet, the founding fathers of the Sakya tradition.

== Life ==
He was born in the year of the water dog of the second cycle at Sakya and was acclaimed as an incarnation of Durjayachandra. His mother was called Machik Wodron. He received extensive spiritual training from his father, Sachen Kunga Nyingpo, the first of the five founding fathers of the Sakya-tradition. At age 17, he went to Sangphu Neuthok and deepened his studies under the famous scholar Chapa Chokyi Senge. His studies included Paramita, Madhyamaka, Pramana, Vinaya and Abhidharma. By the time he was eighteen he had mastered the triple discipline of teaching, debate and composition. After his return to Sakya, he held the throne of the monastery for three years and then passed the authority to his younger brother, Jetsun Dragpa Gyaltsen, the third of the five founding fathers. He dedicated the rest of his life to studies and meditation. In 1182 he passed into pure land of Sukhavati, the water tiger year, at age 41. He is said to have attained full Buddhahood.

A 17th-century painting of Sonam Tsemo from Ngor Monastery is held by the Los Angeles County Museum of Art.

== Translations ==
Bodhicaryavatara With Commentary. Translated by Adrian O'Sullivan (Dechen Foundation, 2019).

Admission at Dharma's Gate (Sakya Kongma Series, Volume 3). Translated by Christopher Wilkinson (CreateSpace, 2014).

The Yogini's Eye (Classics of the Early Sakya, Volume 1). Translated by Hiroshi Somani Gyatso and Wayne Verrill (Xlibris, 2012).
