= Ngor =

Destroyed Tibetan Buddhist monastery near Shigatse, Tibet, China

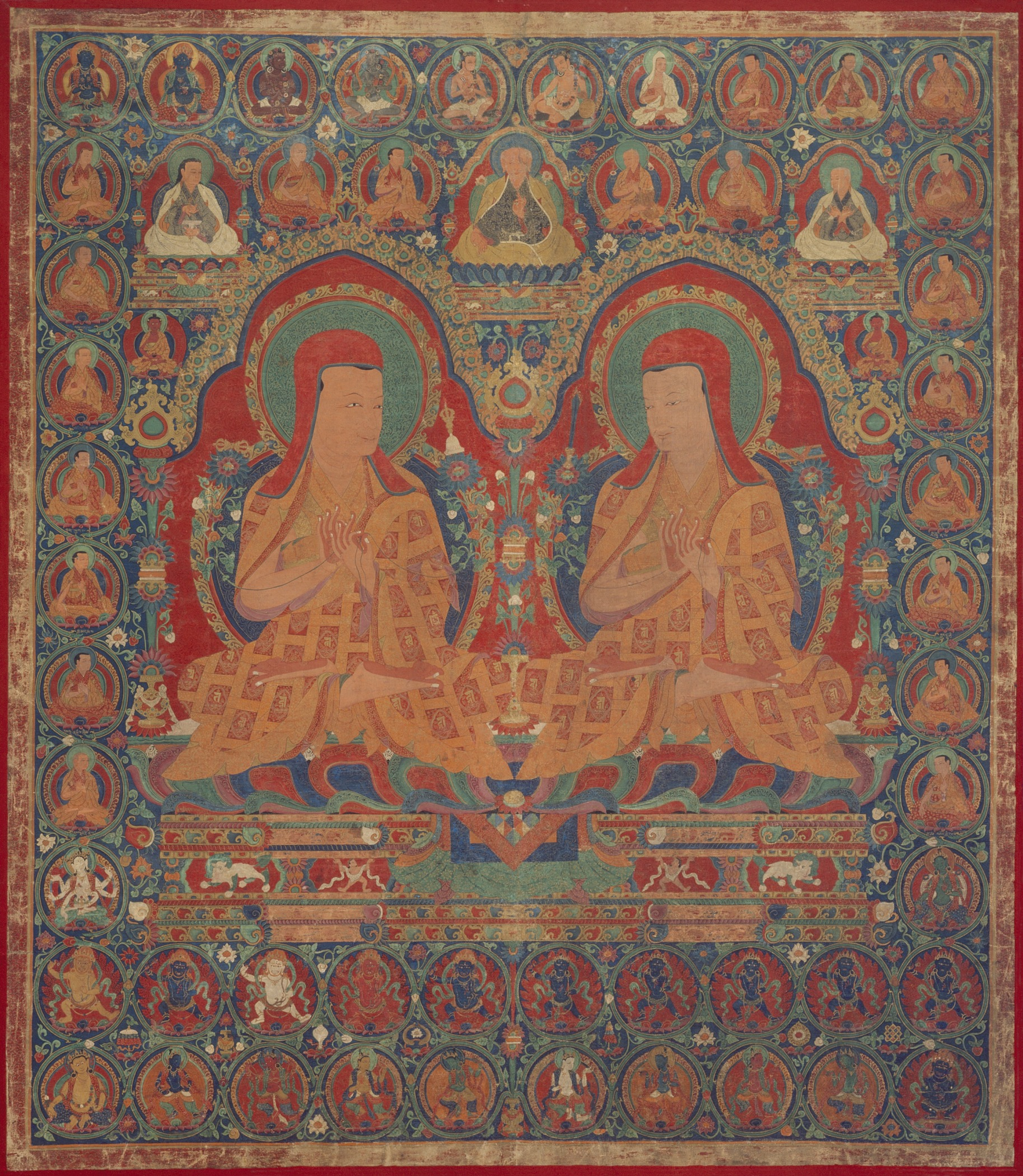
Kunga Wangcuk (1424-1478) and Sonam Senge (1429-1489), The Fourth and Sixth Abbots of Ngor

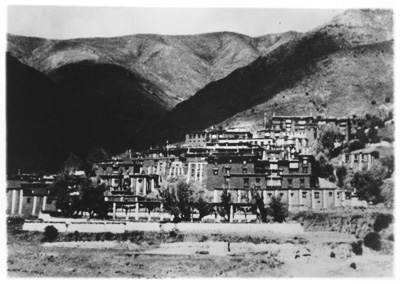
Ngor Monastery in 1955 before its destruction

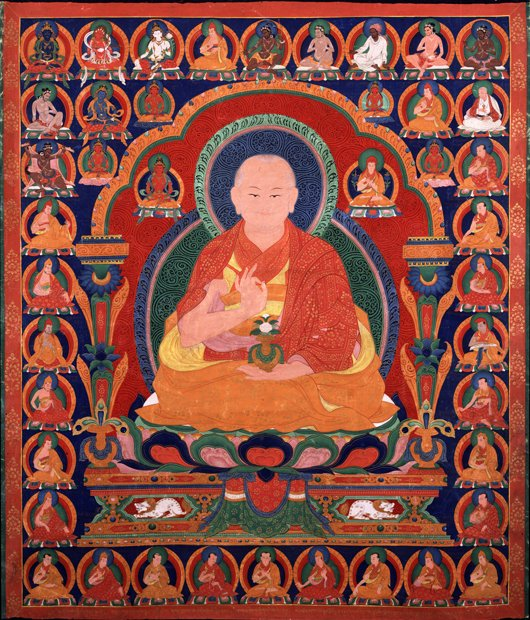
The Ngor Abbot Sanggye Sengge as Lineal Guru of the Path with the Fruit

Ngor or Ngor Éwam Chöden (Tibetan: ངོར་ཨེ་ཝམ་ཆོས་ལྡན།, Chinese: 鄂尔艾旺却丹寺) is the name of a monastery in the Ü-Tsang province of Tibet about 20 kilometres (12 mi) southwest of Shigatse and is the Sakya school's second most important gompa. It is the main temple of the large Ngor school of Vajrayana Buddhism, which represents eighty-five percent of the Sakya school.

== History ==
The origins of the Ngor school go back to Ngorchen Kunga Sangpo (also Kunga Zangpo or Kun dga 'bzang po, Tibetan: ངོར་ཆེན་ཀུན་དགའ་བཟང་པོ།) (1382-1444 CE), who was born and educated at Sakya and founded this monastery in 1429. It was renowned for its rich library of Sanskrit texts and magnificent 15th-century Newar-derived paintings. Of its 18 colleges, and Upper and Lower Tsokangs, only one building, the Lamdre Lhakang, has been restored. There were once some 400 monks, but now there are only a few.

Below the lhakang there is a row of 60 stupa renovated but missing the magnificent mandala paintings they once contained, but which are now preserved in Japan and have been documented and published.

Ngorchen Konchog Lhundrup, born in Sakya in 1497, was a famous practitioner who became the tenth abbot of Ngor Ewam Choden monastery.

The two other main sects of the Sakya school are Sakya proper and Tsar. The main Ngor temples are found in the Kham region of Tibet.

The Ngorpa school is characterized by an emphasis on tantra balanced with study and practice. It is known for a mastery of ritual and practice of long retreats including lifelong retreats. The present leader of the Ngor is HE Luding (or Lhuding) Khenpo, who now lives in northern India.
