= Sachen Kunga Nyingpo =

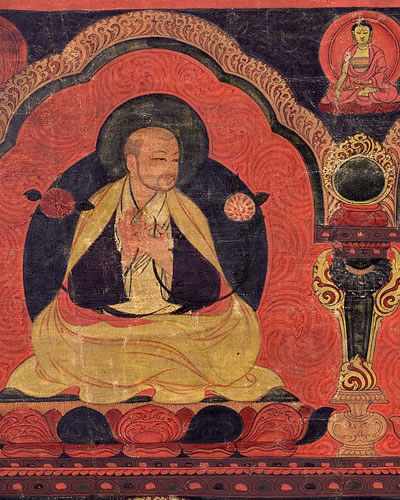
Sachen Kunga Nyingpo

Sachen Kunga Nyingpo (Tibetan: ས་ཆེན་ཀུན་དགའ་སྙིང་པོ་, Wylie: Sa-chen Kun-dga’ Snying-po) (1092–1158) was a Tibetan spiritual leader and the first of the Five Venerable Supreme Sakya Masters of Tibet. Sachen Kunga Nyinpo was the 3rd Sakya Trizin and son of Khon Konchok Gyalpo (1034–1102) who was the first Sakya Trizin and founder of the first Sakya Monastery in Tibet in 1073.

Sachen Kunga Nyingpo, the son of Khon Konchok Gyalpo and an emanation of Manjushri, was born in 1092 into the prominent Khon clan of Sakya. From early childhood, Sachen showed great signs of wisdom. At the age of twelve, Sachen, under the guidance of his guru, Bari Lotsava, performed one-point meditation on Manjushri. After meditating on this for a continuous period of six months, the bodhisattva appeared in front of him and gave him the teachings on the parting of four attachments as follows:

- If you cling to this life, then you are not a dharma practitioner;
- If you cling to the wheel of existence, then you do not possess renunciation (nekkhamma);
- If you look only to your own interests, then you do not possess bodhichitta;
- If clinging ensues, then you do not possess the view.

Sachen realised in an instant that this teaching contained the essence of the Path of Perfection. He was a strict vegetarian and received teachings and empowerments on sutras and tantras from many great teachers, including his father and Virupa. Sachen was a man of immense virtue and bodhicitta. He had immeasurable faith in his practice and was a great teacher of Dharma.

Sachen passed all the doctrines to his two sons, Sonam Tsemo and Drakpa Gyaltsen. He died at the age of 67 in 1158.

== See also ==
- Simhamukha
