= Depa Norbu =

Tibetan government official

Norbu (Wylie: nor bu), with the later title of Depa (sde pa) and also known as Nangso Norbu (nang so nor bu), was a Tibetan government official born in the Central Tibetan province of Ü around the end of the 16th century. In 1644 he was appointed Governor of Shigatse, a post he held until 1659 when he succeeded his elder brother, Desi Sonam Rapten as de facto ruler of Tibet on behalf of Lobzang Gyatso, the Fifth Dalai Lama. After a brief reign he rebelled unsuccessfully against the latter and was banished. His last recorded activity was in 1660.

== Place of Origin ==
Norbu was born in the village of Gyalé in the Tolung Valley, north west of Lhasa, Tibet. As younger brother of Desi Sonam Rapten (1595-1658) he was born sometime after 1595.

== Early career and title ==
His early title "Nangso" (lit.: 'internal spy' or 'border protector') indicates an official with military and religious power, or a manager, and is often applied to the younger sibling of a ruling house.

As a young man Norbu was retained as an aide by his brother who was already Treasurer and "Chagdzo" (phyag mdzod - the personal manager and principal attendant) of Lobzang Gyatso, the young Fifth Dalai Lama. In his autobiography Lobzang Gyatso, using his keen eye for detail and character, keeps his readers informed of Norbu's antics and failures in his various roles over the years. While only a few histories covering this period even mention Depa Norbu in passing, his iniquitous activities are best described in Lobzang Gyatso’s autobiography.

== Fifth Dalai Lama's observations ==
Lobzang Gyatso (Note: Since very little is recorded about Norbu in the usual history books, most of what is known about him is taken from the autobiography of the Fifth Dalai Lama (against whom he rebelled), in which he features regularly. Norbu's life is therefore largely portrayed through anecdotes and memoirs taken from the Fifth Dalai Lama's personal experience and point of view - which is not often sympathetic towards the subject but, like the rest of the historical material in his autobiography, apparently quite accurate and factual.) first mentions Norbu as attending a tea party in 1626, invited by the young Tulku Dragpa Gyaltsen (1619-1656) next door at Drepung Monastery (bras spungs dgon pa). The host offered Norbu a ceremonial scarf with a sacred knot but Norbu later undid the knot and exchanged the scarf for some baubles from Kongpo. A monk attendant observed: 'Norbu has no faith in the Tulku'. Norbu is alleged by some, including Trijang Rinpoche, to have suffocated the same Tulku thirty years later with a similar scarf.

A little later Lobzang Gyatso caught the measles and ‘many cats were brought to keep him awake’, apparently as an antidote; Norbu would beat these cats and even stabbed one with a knife. Lobzang Gyatso commented on this cruelty: 'it was the first crowing of a man who would eat man [sic] if he had power'.

Early in 1638, acting as Drepung's Treasurer in a project for each Gelugpa monastery to construct new sets of the Eight Classical Stupas (mchod rten cha brgyad), Norbu insisted on changing the proportions of the Drepung set, which had been designed by master Zurchen Choying Rangdrol. This resulted in their shape being the worst of all, including those of Sera (se ra) and Ganden (dga’ ldan) monasteries.

Shortly afterwards Sonam Rapten was displeased with his chief assistant Jaisang Depa (ja’i sang sde pa) who eventually became the Fifth Dalai Lama's third Regent in 1660; he wanted to appoint Norbu in his place, but Lobzang Gyatso was not happy about it. He objected and vetoed Norbu's promotion.

In the summer of 1638, Norbu married Tulku Dragpa Gyaltsen's sister at Gekhasa (gad kha sa) village in Tolung (stod lung), probably modern-day 'Gyekhar' between Yangpachen (yangs pa can) and Tsurphu (mtshur phu). The heirs to the Gekhasa family had been killed by Mongols so they needed a male groom but Lobzang Gyatso felt Norbu was a poor choice, commenting that the family accepted him "as if it wished to be punished". After this, Norbu was also called 'Gekhasapa Norbu', 'Gekhasapa', 'Gekhasa' and 'Gekha'. According to another history, the Tulku's sister, his only surviving sibling, felt obliged to marry the ambitious Norbu, who was proud of being Desi Sonam Rapten's brother. Norbu was not well-off but he was an opportunist and the marriage increased his wealth and status, enabling him to enter politics; he then became notorious for the violent and unscrupulous ways in which he later dealt with certain practical issues on the regent’s behalf that were embarrassing for a high-ranking religious dignitary like Sonam Rapten.

In 1652 Lobzang Gyatso, invited by the Chinese emperor, left for Beijing and amongst others Norbu accompanied his party a far as the foot of the Nyuglai Lanying pass. Everyone going to China was apprehensive about the diseases and other dangers of the perilous journey, wrote Lobzang Gyatso, but Norbu, who was to remain in Lhasa, and seemingly convinced that nobody would be returning, was delighted that he did not have to go and he did not hide his pleasure.

In 1654 Lobzang Gyatsho proposed to offer a public long-life wang (dbang), a major personal blessing, to all his followers, aware that it would be very popular. The Desi agreed but Norbu started drawing up a tariff of fees to charge everyone for attending the event, according to their status. Lobzang Gyatsho felt embarrassed but rather than rebuking Norbu for his cupidity he simply gave up the idea, not wishing to appear greedy by charging people to attend his teachings.

In 1656 Lobzang Gyatsho was busy organising various religious projects, creating murals, statues, multiple copies of the Buddha’s teachings and so forth. A sculptor called Dol Nesarwa (dol gnas gsar ba) had neatly carved a complete set of ritual phurba (phur ba) daggers from teakwood for him and was working on other themes when Norbu suddenly had him transferred to the south of Tibet to help construct military catapults. Lobzang Gyatsho lamented that Norbu made this artist, incapable of doing anything harmful, suddenly disappear from his project staff.

A little later in 1656 Norbu gets a positive mention, the only one he earns in Lobzang Gyatso's autobiography. Diplomatic tensions with Nepal necessitated the rescue of a special statue of 'the exalted Vati', a form of Chenrezig, from Kyirong temple near the Nepal border. Norbu and Dronnyer Drungpa (mgron gnyer drung pa) were deputed to go there and retrieve it and they actually succeeded in doing so. Lobzang Gyatso noted this success as an auspicious occasion. However, he refers to a prophecy warning that the relocation of the statue to central Tibet could portend the death of an important personage. Next mentioned in the autobiography is the illness and death of Tulku Dragpa Gyaltsen aged 36. His spirit is then said to have manifested as the spirit Shugden (shugs ldan), and some, including Trijang Rinpoche, allege that he was murdered by suffocation at the hands of Depa Norbu.

== Military commander, 1641-1643 ==
In 1641, during the Tibetan civil war, Norbu was deputed to lead a body of troops west from Shun, six miles east of Lhasa, via upper Tolung to reinforce Gushri Khan's Mongol army besieging the fort at Shigatse. Avoiding Kagyu resistance en route he progressed at a snail's pace, finally reaching Chushur (chu shur) on the north bank of the Tsangpo (gtsang po) after dawdling along and losing time. His men eventually engaged in battle in Tsang (gtsang) under Gopa Tashi of Drungme (grong smad dgo pa bkra shis). Some were assigned to operate cannons, others to take positions on hilltops. However, Norbu refused to do anything and when the cannon station was lost to the enemy he was the first man to leave his post and run away.

In the summer of 1642 during the first uprising in Tsang after the war he was charged with holding Gyantse fort (rgyal rtse rdzong) but when a small group of rebels attacked he abandoned it and fled.

In 1643, to quell another rebellion in Kongpo (kong po), east of Lhasa, Sonam Rapten despatched an army under the joint leadership of Norbu and Tardong Donnyer (star sdong mgrong gnyer). The latter complained it was more like a boss and his servant, rather than co-commanders.

== Governor of Shigatse, 1644-1659 ==
Regent Sonam Rapten appointed Norbu as Governor of Shigatse in 1644. Lobzang Gyatso wrote that most people began to call him 'Desi' or 'Depa' and he put on airs of being the Regent's brother. 'Depa' ('Governor' or 'Commissioner') was in current use but 'Desi' (Regent, Administrative Ruler or Prime Minister) was hardly used during Lobzang Gyatso's lifetime; it was only retrospectively applied to his Regents from the early 18th century. Norbu retained this post until 1659.

== Military investigator, 1646 ==
In 1644 Sonam Rapten, angered by Bhutan’s support for the rebellions of 1642/43, and imagining that his victorious, combined Tibetan/Mongolian forces were invincible, despatched an army to punish and if possible capture Bhutan but to his surprise it was easily routed by the Bhutanese defense forces. Bhutan was founded by 'Zhabdrung' Ngawang Namgyel (Zhabs Drung Ngag Dbang Rnam Rgyal, 1594–1651) of the Drukpa Kagyu tradition, who had fled Tibet in 1616 over a dispute concerning his claimed status as the incarnation of the Fourth Drukchen, Padma Karpo ('brug chen pad+ma dkar po, 1527-1592). Once welcomed into exile by the Bhutanese the Zhabdrung assumed national leadership by popular acclaim and consolidated the Himalayan country into its modern form. He was renowned as a tantric magician having allegedly attained spiritual powers which he used inter alia to protect Bhutan against such invasions from Tibet, of which this was the fourth attempt he had successfully faced but the first from the new Geluk government; the first three had been from the king of Tsang.

This surprise defeat became a popular topic for mockery of Tibet's new Geluk regime in Lhasa. In 1646 Norbu was sent south to the Bhutan border to investigate the humiliating rout. Norbu returned to report inter alia that the Bhutanese had indeed captured twenty five Tibetan army officers including the three most senior commanders and all the army's weapons, armour and equipment.

A satirical song then became popular using word-play to mock Norbu, the new Governor of Shigatse, for acting as a common spy (Tibetan: ‘so pa’), playing on his earlier title, ‘Nangso’ ('border protector'), on his name Norbu ('jewel'), on the Zhabdrung's renown as a magician as the lama in the south and finally on the precious vertebrae relic of the First Drukchen Tsangpa Gyare Yeshe Dorje (gtsang pa rgya ras ye shes rdo rje, 1161-1211, founder of Ralung monastery and the Drkpa Kagyu tradition), which was brought from Tibet by the Zhabdrung:

"The lama must be residing in the south,
For all offerings [armour, weapons etc.] were made to the south.
The Drukpas have captured Nidup [Ngodrup, one of the Tibetan officers: also spiritual powers];
Norbu [jewel, i.e. the vertebrae relic] has worked as a spy [protector, as in protective deity or spirit]".

== Army commander, 1648-1649 ==
Sonam Rapten negotiated a post-1644 invasion peace treaty with Bhutan, obtaining release of the hostages, but then broke it in 1648 by sending in a much bigger, three-pronged invasion force. He appointed Norbu as commander of the main army, marching east from Shigatse via Phagri (phag ri) to Paro (spa ro) in western Bhutan where he tried to attack the fort. Each time the Bhutanese counter-attacked, Norbu is variously described as having fled, escaped in terror, deserted, lost his saddle and took flight to Phagri followed by his troops. He retreated to Tibet with his men following, once again abandoning all their arms, weapons and equipment. Hearing of this, the other two columns retreated from Punakha and headed home, making a fiasco of the attempted invasion. Norbu was left with a common tent, his elaborate and costly one having been captured. There were various uncomplimentary stories about him. Due to his mistakes, the army even had great difficulty retreating and the other commanders made endless complaints about his behaviour. This shameful defeat went down as disgraceful in the history of Tibet. Tibetans rebuked Norbu for his cowardice and made a mockery of his flight, as Lobzang Gyatsho later noted. Despite all this, under his brother's protection he retained his position as Governor of Shigatse.

Norbu was even accused of betrayal, indulging in secret dealings with the Bhutanese enemy, but despite his incompetence, cowardice and duplicity Lobzang Gyatsho tried to come to terms with him, hoping that he might yet turn out to be a good leader.

== Commander-in-Chief, 1656-57 ==
After Gushri Khan's death in 1655 Sonam Rapten organised one last attempt at capturing Bhutan to obliterate the memory of his earlier defeats and suppress Kagyu resistance against the Geluk, a constant threat to internal stability. He appointed Norbu as overall commander of four large invading armies but Norbu, involved in a plot with the Bhutanese, asked Lobzang Gyatso to have the invasion postponed. Seeing no purpose in this and knowing Sonam Rapten and other leaders would not agree, he refused; there was also no indication from divinations or oracles to delay.

Norbu advanced in the summer of 1656, but too slowly and cautiously and his tactics were inept. Nechung Oracle had predicted success but later blamed the failure on his incompetence; Lobzang Gyatso also criticised him for not sticking to the agreed plan. As he continued to employ cowardly delaying tactics his army gradually wasted away through illness. The Bhutanese used guerrilla tactics to sap morale and after an entire year of ineffective campaigning in the inhospitable climate and the dense jungles Norbu retreated to Tibet and camped near the border at Phagri, unable to make a decision.

Internal divisions also arose, due to Norbu’s poor leadership. The two Mongol princes with their own troops, Dalai Batur (da la’i bA thur) and Machik Taiji (ma gcig tha’i ji), quarrelled with Norbu about his cowardly tactics and Norbu is said to have poisoned the latter after he severely criticised Norbu's policy. One of Norbu’s men, Taglung Mentrongpa (stag lung sman grong pa), wrote to Sonam Rapten to defend Norbu and blame the Mongols, claiming they would not care if everyone in Tibet died. Lobzang Gyatso, however, disagreed and defended the Mongols and their good character; they were simply too ashamed to have to retreat from battle under Norbu's orders.

The Samye oracle had been consulted beforehand and advised against the invasion. When asked again, whether the army should retreat or advance, it replied that since they had not taken its advice before they should not ask again. It advised to ask 'the Geshe' since he, the oracle, had no idea.

Norbu's behaviour was dubious; he let himself be defeated and his army retreated from Phagri in disgrace after the disastrous campaign. Eventually, a peace treaty was negotiated by the Panchen Lama and others, allowing for the release of prisoners by the Bhutanese. Thus ended the third Geluk-Bhutan war involving Norbu.

There had been many instances of Norbu's botched leadership but he was never held to account and his brother Sonam Rapten pretended not to hear about it. In the end, however, the proliferation of negative reports from his stint in Shigatse and his dishonest activities became so notorious that he was publicly censured.

== Appointed as Regent, 1659 ==
Sonam Rapten died in the spring of 1658 but Lobsang Gyatso kept it a secret to hold off political instability while he arranged the succession by Norbu, heir apparent, in such a way that Norbu would be unable to dominate him. (Note: The Fifth Dalai Lama's decree made 20 years later in 1679, appointing Sangye Gyatso as his sixth regent, indicates succession by next of kin was apparently the tradition: in the preamble he explains how, back in 1660, "as all members of [Sonam Rapten's] family had died I appointed [the unrelated] Trinlé Gyatso and others in succession" as regent in their place. What is left unsaid in this preamble is that the Fifth Dalai Lama had, in fact, appointed Depa Norbu to succeed Sonam Rapten as regent in 1659 before Trinlé Gyatso and that he had served several months in this capacity before rebelling against the government. Norbu was also, indeed, still very much alive in 1660 but had disqualified himself through his rebellion.) For 13 months this pretence was maintained while prayers and rituals were carried out, ostensibly dedicated to Sonam Rapten's return to health, until the spring of 1659 when the death was announced and funeral rites were carried out in Sonam Rapten's honour.

Soon Lobzang Gyatso nominated Depa Sepo (sde pa sras po), a friend and associate of Norbu to replace Norbu as Governor of Shigatse; he then spent eight days negotiating discretely with 'the Two Royal Brothers', the Mongol successors of Gushri Khan, Tendzin Dayan Gyalpo (bstan ‘dzin da yan rgyal po) and Tendzin Dalai Han (bstan ‘dzin da la’i tan rgyal po), to ensure and arrange their support in case of need, probably making contingency plans in case Norbu got too out of control after his promotion. The Mongols left Lhasa to stand by at their pastures in Dam ('dam)to the north, just before Norbu arrived from Shigatse. Lobzang Gyatso observed that Norbu appeared to be 'an impressively natural leader' but whether this was noted mockingly or not is unclear.

Two weeks later, on the 16th of the 6th month of the Earth-pig year (i.e. around late July, 1659), Lobzang Gyatso told his chamberlain to go and inform Norbu that he was to be appointed as Regent to succeed the late Sonam Rapten. The surprised chamberlain hesitated, saying that if this was simply a tactful gesture he risked it being accepted by Norbu which would not have been appropriate. But Lobzang Gyatso insisted that he was serious, the message was delivered and Norbu accepted. Next day, Lobzang Gyatso sent a second message to Norbu, scolding him for having failed in the past to do his duty well. Then, he restricted Norbu's powers regarding the Regent's official residence, preventing him from using it for personal ends. All this would have been hard to bear for Norbu who was used to doing as he liked with impunity under his now deceased brother's protection.

There was no inauguration ceremony apart from a gathering of important teachers and monks at the Potala to pay respects to Norbu. Lobzang Gyatso mocked this elite as being learned in religion but ignorant of worldly affairs, suggesting perhaps that there was more to Norbu's appointment than met the eye. It was apparently expected there would be exchanges of gifts, but Norbu, he wrote, was as selfish as the Taglung treasurer: they merely exchanged vases of water.

== Reign as Regent, 1659 ==
There is no account of Norbu's activities in office but Lobzang Gyatso describes how later that summer he received imperial messengers himself and negotiated with them regarding gifts and diplomas they wanted to offer to the old king of Yarlung. Then in the 8th month Lobzang Gyatso had a project workshop set up to create a new crown for the special statue of Chenrezig (spyan ras gzigs) called Rangjon Ngaden (rang byon lnga ldan). Earlier, Sonam Rapten had prevented him from doing so and he had been obliged to postpone the project but now he did so without reference to Norbu.

In the same month Lobzang Gyatso notes a delay in the agreed departure of the previous occupiers of the official Gekhasa residence, preventing Norbu from moving in. He also notes that this was the time when Ngodrup (dngos grub), Tregang Tsering (bkras sgang tshe ring) and other close associates of Norbu's were all about to hatch a plot against him.

== Rebellion of 1659-60 ==
On the eve of the Earth-pig New Year (1659) there had been severe disruption to the end-of-year rites by spirits and Lobzang Gyatso wrote that it presaged the coming conflict with Norbu and his associate Ngodrup.

In the 9th month of 1659-1660, he consulted Nojin Chenpo (gnod sbyin chen po), the wrathful spirit which had been oath-bound and installed at Samye Monastery by Padmasambhava (o rgyan padma 'byung nas) 800 years before. The spirit warned him: “If you do not care about Norbu, it will be as if you fail to act when the goat is in its enclosure; you will not catch it, [he will be] like a musk deer running away on the rocks.”

In the 10th month, the plot began to thicken. Norbu's relatives and close associates, his nephew Ngodrup and family asked permission to visit hot springs in Tsang. Lobzang Gyatso allowed it, while suspicious of their motives. Then, with the connivance of new Shigatse governor Depa Sepo, they and other accomplices such as Tregangpa (bkras sgang pa) seized and occupied Shigatse fort in an open act of rebellion against the Gaden Phodrang government. Lesser officials unwilling to join the revolt were dismissed and expelled from the fort. In Lhasa, Lobzang Gyatso had many visitors expressing sympathy and support and the protector spirit Nechung (gnas chung) warned that Norbu himself was escaping, in accordance with the spirit Nojin Chenpo's prediction. Revenue collectors in the south then reported seeing Norbu heading west. Evidently, he had deserted his post and gone to join his co-conspirators in Tsang.

Norbu's rebellion was supported by the Tsang nobility, the Sakya hierarch and the Fourth Drukchen, Padma Karpo. Shigatse’s close affiliation with the Tsangpa regime, the previous rulers of central Tibet, and with the Karma Kagyu tradition, made it the ideal location from which to instigate a rebellion against the Geluk government. Any disturbance in Tsang was bound to cause alarm. In an additional act of treachery, Norbu's co-conspirator Tregangpa was sent south to persuade the Bhutanese enemy to send their army to enter Tibetan territory and join the rebel army against the Lhasa government.

Lobzang Gyatso sent investigators to check on the situation in Shigatse. They reported that Depa Sepo had improperly dismissed all officials unwilling to join the revolt, Tregangpa had intimidated Tashilhunpo and the revenue collectors and Norbu and Ngodrup had seized control of the fort. Hearing this, Lobzang Gyatso summoned his loyal ministers and generals, including Jaisang Depa and Dronnyer Drungpa, for a council of war. They decided to send an expeditionary force to Shigatse forthwith. Taiji of Ukhere, a Mongolian prince who had, conveniently, just arrived from the north with a hundred soldiers and gifts of gold, silver, silk and porcelain, agreed to march his men to Shigatse right away and Dronnyer Drungpa was detailed to guide him. Two army commanders were appointed and orders for the rapid mobilisation and despatch of additional forces were issued.

Rituals of suppression and liberation based on the violent rite of Jampel Layshin Marmo ('Jam dpal las gshin dmar mo) were carried out, led by the chief officiating prelate Ngagrampa Lobzang Dondrub (sngags ram pa blo bzang don grub), and signs of success occurred Meanwhile the Shigatse fort officials and Lobzang Geleg (blo bzang dge legs), Treasurer of Tashilhunpo, who had all been expelled by Depa Sepo, were keeping Lhasa informed about the goings-on at the fort, and advised that Trashi Tsepa of Shang (shangs bkra shis rtse pa), near Shigatse, was proving very helpful, providing the army with useful advice and information.

Others, however, had defected to the rebels. The 89-year old Panchen Lama, still in Shigatse and trying to negotiate a compromise, corresponded with Lobzang Gyatsho who concluded, after discussion, that the impending conflict with Norbu's rebels could not be postponed. Meanwhile, more rituals were being carried out to bring Norbu down, with signs of success: when the torma was hurled to the west a windstorm arose and the torma flamed and splintered.

When the Panchen Lama sent negotiators to lobby for buying off Norbu and his rebels with forts and estates, thereby avoiding the use of force, Lobzang Gyatso was not impressed. Recounting Norbu’s history of misdeeds to the negotiators derisively, he roundly mocked and scornfully dismissed their proposals. They tried to intimidate him but it was 'like displaying a mask to a child'; he was unimpressed and dealt with the negotiators 'as if treating an illness' before sending them away. Lobzang Gyatso had decided to 'combine the two traditions': a show of military force to scare the rebels and a series of magic rituals perhaps designed to terrify the more superstitious amongst them.

In the 11th month Ganden Monastery's Abbot, Damcho Namgyal (byang rtse chos rje dam chos rnam rgyal), accompanied by a distinguished delegation including a former Ganden Tripa obtained an audience with Lobzang Gyatsho, claiming to be Norbu’s brother and lobbying on his behalf. He even claimed the award of some property, landed estates, for Norbu and his henchmen, if not for himself. This annoyed Lobzang Gyatso severely and, knowing very well that Norbu had no such brother, after deriding the abbot’s petition on various counts he dismissed it with contempt.

Meanwhile Taiji of Ukhere had reached Shigatse fort to find Tregangpa had returned from his mission to Bhutan and fortified the areas around the castle. In the clashes that followed as the Taiji's men tried to extract the defenders, Tregangpa was captured and brought out 'like a lamb to the slaughter'. The plan to recapture the fort was put into operation.

First, the Two Royal Mongol Brothers, Tendzin Dayan Gyalpo and Tendzin Dalai Han, now arrived on the scene in Shigatse with their forces. It would appear that this was not a coincidence. Shortly before Norbu had arrived in Lhasa from Shigatse a few months earlier they had met Lobzang Gyatsho for eight days of detailed conversations concerning leadership, history and 'matters of concern to the Mongols'. Considering the incompatibility and animosity between Norbu and the Mongols following the three military debacles in Bhutan it is likely that they were preparing contingency plans in case things went awry with Norbu after his expected promotion to Desi. They left for their pastures in Dam, Norbu arrived and was appointed, he later deserted and made Shigatse the base of his rebellion and now the Mongols turned up there with their armies as if they had been ready and waiting for it. While backed up by their armed forces they assumed the role of impartial mediators. Norbu and Ngodrup assured them that they, the brothers, had been deceived by Lobzang Gyatsho’s aides, and to maintain their posture as mediators the brothers pretended to believe it.

The second part of the strategy, magic ritual, was also unfolding. Lobzang Gyatsho detailed the government’s chief ritual officiator, the Nyingmapa Trulku Dorjedrag Rigdzin (rdo rje rig ‘dzin) the 4th and his team of 30 assistants to go to Gongkar (gong dkar) and perform the rite of the wind wheel for accomplishing strategic policy, the defeat of Norbu’s rebellion, through suppression and destruction. There was a sign of success: the wind wheel rapidly produced flames. Similar success was signified by the Trulku after he had the same rites carried out by the men of Palri (dpal ri) at Chonggye (‘phyong rgyas). The physician Lobzang Norbu Palden of Pusang (sbus srang drung ’tsho ba blo bzang nor bu) then violently cursed Norbu and Ngodrup whilst performing the atonement rite of Palden Dungkyongma (dpal ldan dung skyong ma).

Lobzang Gyatso then consulted ‘King spirit' Tshangpa Dungthochen (tshang pa dung thod can), through its oracle, to see what it suggested. To defeat Norbu's rebellion and promote loyalty to the government it specified the Du-dog (Bdud bzlog) rite to be performed by all members of Geluk establishments that were philosophical in nature and the Tor-dog (Gtor bzlog) by the rest. In the context of this rebellion the purpose of publicly propitiating, in this way, loyalty to the Tibetan government, including in Mongolia, seems clear: any superstitious members of the Tibetan public who sympathised with Norbu and his rebels might have second thoughts if the threat of supernatural retribution was brought into the equation. The lamas and stewards of two hundred and fifty monasteries were ordered to carry out these services nonstop and the government funded all the participants' tea offerings three times a day.

Lhatsun Kunzang Namgyal of Dzogchen (rdzogs chenpa lha btsun kun bzang rnam rgyal) revealed the ritual cycle of Yizhin Norbu Sai Nyingpo (yid bzhin nor bu sa'i snying po) in Demojong ('bras mo ljongs), Sikkim, and sent the relevant texts to Lobzang Gyatso. The latter empowered the Namgyal Monastery monks to perform the rite of Nojin Begtse (gnod sbyin beg tse), the originally pre-Buddhist female wrathful deity and lord of war of the Mongols that wears a coat of mail, and began to perform its destructive rite himself. This involved hurling the wind wheel and the torma, which moved like a malevolent torma, repeatedly flashed, spontaneously burst into flames and produced various other remarkable signs of success.

Lobzang Gyatso now invoked Nojin Chenpo again and the spirit responded through its oracle to declare that they, the eight categories of arrogant deity-demons, wanted to go to Nyangme (nyang smad) [the lower valley of the Nyang Chu, i.e. Shigatse area] for the battle and that an auspicious sign, ritual armour, weapons and musical instruments were needed. These were amply provided and Lobzang Gyatso urged them to take action through transforming the rebels, Norbu and Ngodrup and Tregangpa, into their 'red meals'. To this effect, he also wrote a letter to the spirit. (Note: The text of this letter caused a controversy in 1996 when Tibetologist Professor Elliot Sperling mistook it for an order to a general to massacre the rebels, their families and servants and Wisdom Publications published it as such; as a result the Fifth Dalai Lama was wrongly accused of mass murder in various other publications, and in Wikipedia. See 5th Dalai Lama Controversy for details.) The names of the rebels were placed in the skull-cup of Dorje Phagmo (rdo rjepag mo). The deity Tsen-go Tawara (btsan rgod rta ba ra) was also invoked, and demanded and got offerings of ritual armour and weapons, and a scarf.

Lobzang Gyatso was about to perform a destructive rite based on Namchag Urmo (Gnam lcags ur mo) when a messenger came from the Dragna Choje (brag sna chos rje), Dharma master or rituals Master of Changchub Ling (gsang sngags byang chub gling), a Nyingma monastery in Chushur which had been founded by Lobzang Gyatsho in 1651 to maintain the ritual practices in his absence. He expected the message would be about how to perform a destructive rite but it was instead a long message stating how Norbu and Ngodrup were in the right. Lobzang Gyatso, clearly exasperated, declined to even reply and, contrary to custom, the messenger was sent back without being given any food.

More rituals were undertaken, with frequent signs of success: sudden windstorms arising, ritual wheels bursting into flames, tormas flashing and the like. In Kyisho, the Lhasa valley, the performance of rituals intensified. Renowned tantric sorcerers such as Chingpa Ngagrampa (bying pa sngags ram pa) were commissioned by Lobzang Gyatsho to increase pressure on the rebels. Nyingma artists Agur (a gur) of Zhikashar (gzhis ka shar) and his brother Ngagwang Trinle (ngag dbang ‘phrin las) drew the wind wheels of Lungmar (rlung gmar) (the ‘Red Wind’ deity) and Begtse and the rite was performed immaculately; also at Luphug (klu phug). Others were sent to shoot the torma of Lungmar towards Tsang where Norbu was installed and to place the wheel of Begtse at the corner of the Potala’s temple hall. As soon as they began the wheel rite, a powerful windstorm broke out each day. Even where negotiations were being held at Shigatse the felt tent was nearly overturned by a storm. Others reported having to have their food well before noon since from midday until sunset, due to the gale the only thing they could do was to pull down the lower parts of the tent and hold them down with heavy objects. Similar effects continued to occur, windstorms and so forth being attributed to the presence or wrathful deities and spirits manifesting their power and intent. In support of the tantric rites, the thousands of monks of the three great monasteries and others, provided with tea and rations by the government, recited the sutras. Other rites, both tantric and sutric, are described by Lobzang Gyatsho as taking place elsewhere, all aimed at propitiating a peaceful resolution to the conflict. All this must have created a tremendous amount of gossip and speculation amongst the superstitious populace as they wondered about what would happen to the rebels under this tremendous onslaught of destructive rituals. Indeed Lobzang Gyatso noted laconically that since the rebels and officials in the fort were deeply superstitious, they 'accordingly perceived disturbances'.

Superstitious attitudes and spirit-fear may have not only dampened support for the rebels from the people of Tsang and Bhutan but also caused the rebels themselves to lose heart, negotiate and abandon Shigatse fort. In the second twelfth month monks led by the Dragna Choje (brag sna chos rje), rituals master of Drepung, performed the rites of protection, aversion, liberating and suppression based on the deity Jampal Mei Putri ('jam dpal me'i spu gri). The idea of the rebels being bought off with landed property recurred again. Rumours circulated that Norbu would probably be given Khartse (mkhar rtse) fort in Phenyul (phen yul) and that of Maldro Gungkar (mal gro gung dkar) would go to Ngodrup. A negotiated settlement seemed to be on the cards, when all of a sudden it is simply stated that Norbu and Ngodrup, after handing over the fort to the commanders of the government forces, left for Samdrup Dechen (bsam grub bde chen) in Dam. Dam is an area of pastureland that was favoured by the Mongols about two hundred kilometres north of Lhasa, southeast of Namtso Lake. It was about March 1660 and the rebellion was over, less than three months after it began. The Tibetan soldiers dispersed.

Norbu's sudden departure and the government’s reoccupation of the fort are linked by Lobzang Gyatsho to a rite carried out by the Dragna Choje. The rebels’ surrender took place, when Lobzang Ngawang (blo bzang ngag dbang), the Dragna Choje, with some monks, practised the rite of the wheel of expulsion and sent the ritual item representing the rebels away to the northern plain as a ritual gesture of expulsion. Norbu and Ngodrup promptly accepted the offer that was on the table, quit the fort and headed north themselves.

The Two Royal Brothers then returned to Lhasa to report that Norbu and Ngodrup had connived with Bhutan to send its army in support of their revolt, and that this army had crossed the border into Tibet and reached Phagri. This danger had been foreseen, however, and a force had been sent to Phagri to repel the invasion, although no actual fighting is reported. This happened on the same day that a ritual torma of the deity Jampal Dudra ('jam dpal dus dgra) was taken out of the Potala to be hurled. It was after hearing the news of the Bhutanese army’s withdrawal from Phagri that Norbu and Ngodrup gave up hope and surrendered the fort.

In any case the whole rebellion ended without significant violence; it seems from Lobzang Gyatso's account that it was mainly fought by gods and demons on the spiritual plane.

== Fugitive, 1660, and exile ==
Norbu and Ngodrup, the rebel ringleaders, had been promised forts and land by the Two Royal Brothers. Lobzang Gyatso was not at all happy to reward their treachery in this way but out of respect for the Mongols he was grudgingly making arrangements to cede some suitable territories to them. Meanwhile Norbu and Ngodrup were being escorted to Lhasa from Dam when halfway there they panicked, escaped and sought sanctuary as fugitives in Taklung Monastery (stag lung grwa tshang).

The Mongols saw this act as a betrayal of trust and withdrew their support from them; their offer of forts and land was now off the table. Norbu and Ngodrup were then held at Taglung Monastery under guarantee and that is the last that is related about Norbu by Lobzang Gyatso. However, Norbu is further mentioned by the Tibetan historian Dungkar (dung-dkar) as, ultimately, turning his back on Lobzang Gyatso and fleeing to exile in Bhutan.

== Sources ==
- Aris, Michael (1979). Bhutan: The Early History of a Himalayan Kingdom. Warminster, UK: Aris & Philips Ltd. ISBN 0856680826.
- Bultrini, Raimondo(Translated by Maria Simmons) (2013). The Dalai Lama and the King Demon. New York: Tibet House US. ISBN 9780967011523.
- Dhondup, K (1984). The Water-Horse and Other Years. Dharamsala: Library of Tibetan Works and Archives History Series.
- Dungkar Losang Khrinley (2002). Dungkar Tibetological Great Dictionary. Beijing: China Tibetology Publishing House. p. 1,205. ISBN 7-80057-540-3.
- Lobsang Gyatso, ngag dbang blo bzang rgya mtsho, Fifth Dalai Lama (1679). Autobiography, Good Silk Cloth, 3 vols., rang rnam du kü la'i gos bzang, TBRC W175. Volume III, fo. 128a, Handprint Proclamation on the Triple Steps of the Potala Palace, rtse pho brang po tā la’i gsum skas ‘go’i rtsi tshig phyag rjes ma.
- Karmay, Samten G. (2009). The Arrow and the Spindle, Studies in History, Myths, Rituals and Beliefs in Tibet. Revised edition. Kathmandu, Nepal, Mandala Book Point. ISBN 9789994655106.
- Karmay, Samten G. (Translator) (2014). Trulwai Roltsai; The Illusive Play ["Dukula"]: The Autobiography of the Fifth Dalai Lama. Serindia Publications. Chicago. ISBN 978-1-932476675.
- Lobsang Gyatso, 5th Dalai Lama (1652). Biography of Yonten Gyatso, 4th Dalai Lama. "Jig rten dbang phyug thams cad mkhyen pa yon tan rgya mtsho dpal bzang po’i rnam par thar pa nor bu’i ‘phreng ba". Tibetan Buddhist Resource Centre. W294-1813-eBook.pdf
- Phuntsho, Karma (2013). The History of Bhutan. Vintage Books/Random House, India. ISBN 978-8184004113
- Richardson, Hugh E. (1998) High Peaks, Pure Earth; Collected Writings on Tibetan History and Culture. Serindia Publications, London. ISBN 0906026466
- Peter Schweiger (2015). The Dalai Lama and the Emperor of China: A Political History of the Tibetan Institution of Reincarnation. New York: Columbia University Press. p. 39. ISBN 9780231168526.
- Shakabpa, Tsepon W.D. (1967), Tibet: A Political History. New York: Yale University Press, and (1984), Singapore: Potala Publications. ISBN 0961147415.
- Shakabpa, Tsepon W.D. (2010). One Hundred Thousand Moons. An Advanced Political History of Tibet (Translated by: Derek F. Maher) (2 volumes). Leiden (Netherlands), Boston (USA): Brill's Tibetan Studies Library. ISBN 9789004177321.
- Trijang Rinpoche. (1967). Extensive Commentary of the Propitiatory Text of Shugden, Gyalchen Todrel (Wylie: rGyal chen bstod ’grel).
- Tucci, Giuseppe. 1949. Tibetan Painted Scrolls. Rome: La Libreria dello Stato, Vol. 1 of 3.
