= Jaisang Depa =

Tibetan Buddhist monk

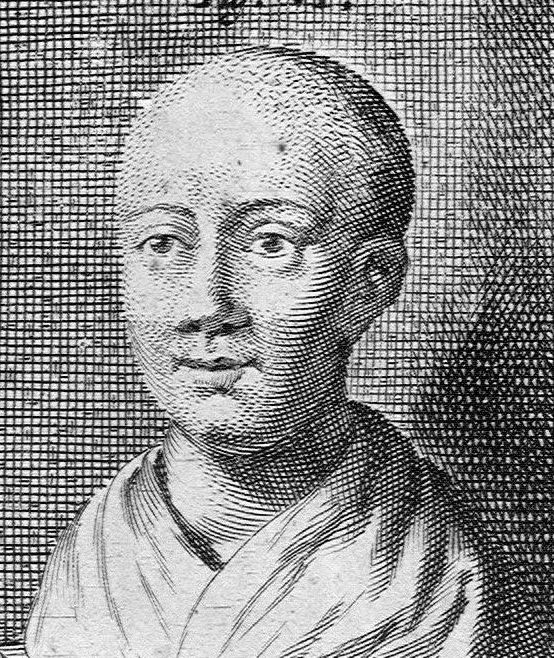
Jaisang Depa (detail) by A. Kircher, based on a drawing from life by Johannes Grueber (see 'Activities as Regent')

Jaisang Depa (jaisang sde pa) was born as Trinle Gyatso ('phrin las rgya mtsho) in the Ü province of Tibet around the beginning of the seventeenth century. He was also known as Drongmene (grong smad nas) meaning the person from Drongme (grong smad) village. A monk of the Geluk tradition, he served as Personal Assistant to Lobzang Gyatso, the Fifth Dalai Lama (blo bzang rgya mtsho) from 1632 to 1660. In 1660 he was appointed as Regent, de facto Ruler of Tibet, by Lobzang Gyatso, who renamed him at that point as Trinle Gyatso. In this post he succeeded Depa Norbu (sde pa nor bu) (r. 1659-1660) and retained it until his death in 1668. He was the Fifth Dalai Lama's third Regent out of a total of six and was succeeded by Lobzang Tutop (blo bzang mthu stobs).

== Place and date of birth ==
Jaisang Depa was born as Trinle Gyatso in the village estate of Drongme in Nyangtren (nyang bran), to the north of Lhasa (lha sa) and not far from Sera Monastery, an estate which Lobzang Gyatso visited in 1629. His birth date is not recorded but since he served as an attendant of the infant Fifth Dalai Lama (b. 1617) from around 1620 or 1622, it is likely that he was born around the end of the sixteenth century or the start of the seventeenth.

== Family history, names and titles ==
Jaisang Depa's family claimed descent from the Kagyud teacher Tshurton Wang-nge (mtshur ston dbang nge). He was given the title of 'Jaisang Depa' in 1637 by the Mongol chieftain Gushri Khan (gushri khan), who had come to Lhasa in triumph after defeating his fellow Mongol Chogtu Tayiji (chog thu tha'i ji) and his army in the Amdo (a mdo) region, north east Tibet. Chogtu had been an ally of the Tsangpa (gtsang pa) and enemy of the Geluk tradition of Tibetan Buddhism to which Lobzang Gyatso and his followers belonged. When Lobzang Gyatso gave Gushri Khan a Tibetan name and the title of "King" in recognition of his feat he responded by awarding titles to Lobzang Gyatso's senior staff, including Trinle Gyatso who was accorded the title of Jaisang Depa. In the autobiography of Lobzang Gyatso he retained this as his name for 23 years, from 1637 until his appointment as Regent in 1660, after which he became known as Trinle Gyatso again, but with the title 'Depa'.

Jaisang Depa's father, Gopa Tashi (dgos pa bkra shis) of Drongme fought as a commander with Geluk forces against Tsang during the 1641-42 Tibetan Civil War. He was injured by shrapnel after Depa Norbu, who was to be Jaisang Depa's predecessor as Lobzang Gyatso's second Regent, and who was under Gopa Tashi's command, fled the battlefield. When Gopa Tashi died in Shigatse (gzhis ka rtse) in 1642 his teeth and hair were sent to Lobzang Gyatso who purified and burned them, out of respect for the deceased; he then used the ashes, which, wrote Lobzang Gyatso, were tinged with gold, to make ink to write the kinds of dharani that were said to liberate those who wore them, or to purify the lower realms; some was also used in making small votive clay images called 'tsha-tsha'.

Jaisang Depa's brother, Nangso Asug (nang so a sug), who died of an illness in 1656, was the father of Desi Sangye Gyatso (sangs rgyas rgya mtsho) (1653-1705) who was destined to be Lobzang Gyatso's sixth, last and best-known Regent. Sangye Gyatso was thus Trinle Gyatso's nephew; he lived with him from an early age and was trained and educated by him, studying all fields of knowledge. After Nangso Asug's death Lobzang Gyatso performed the bone ritual for moulding his bones and hair into many tsha-tsha images.

At some point the family acquired the wider estate of Nyangtren (nyang bran) and Jaisang Depa also became known as Nyangtren Depa (nyang bran sdepa), as well as Depa Drongmepa (sdepa grong smad pa). In 1660, in succession to Depa Norbu, who had rebelled and been banished, Lobzang Gyatso the Fifth Dalai Lama appointed him to the highest office in the land, that of Desi or Depa, meaning Regent, Viceroy, Prime Minister or 'Ruler'. He is also referred to as Desi Drongmepa Trinle Gyatso.

== Early career ==
As Trinle Gyatso, Jaisang Depa had started his career as a monk of the Ganden Phodrang, the Dalai Lamas' establishment at Drepung Monastery, and helped take care of Lobzang Gyatso the Fifth Dalai Lama from the latter's infancy. In 1632 he was appointed as Lobzang Gyatso's personal assistant, replacing Changngo Chodze (byang ngos chos mdzad) who had displeased the Chagdzo (phyag mdzod), or principal attendant, Sonam Rapten (bsod nams rab brtan).

Lobzang Gyatso states in his autobiography that concerning coverage therein of events up to the age of 15, i.e. his life from his birth in 1617 up to 1632, he had relied on notes that had been taken by Jaisang Depa, amongst others.

Trinle Gyatso is next referred to in the autobiography in 1637 when he began to teach Lobzang Gyatso astronomy in return for the transmission of a sacred text and generous payment, and a little later he assisted Lobzang Gyatso working on his calendar. His expertise and knowledge of astrology is further revealed in 1639 when he started making the calculations for a detailed astrological calendar that Lobzang Gyatso was creating, a job he continued with for the next twelve years.

Later in 1637 the title Jaisang Depa was awarded to him by Gushri Khan. Apart from mentioning certain projects he was given, references to Jaisang Depa/Trinle Gyatso in the autobiography are for the most part trivial, recording for example on seven occasions, in 1648, 1650, 1654 (twice), 1656 (twice) and 1661, that he helped nurse Lobzang Gyatso when he was ill.

In 1638, Jaisang Depa seems to have himself displeased Sonam Rapten who was unhappy with something he had done and sent him away to Olga to collect the autumn harvest. Sonam Rapten wanted to replace him with Depa Norbu but Lobzang Gyatso prevented this and in the end one Lopa Chodze (lo pa chos mdzad) stood in for him.

The projects he was assigned were generally of a religious nature. For example, in 1640, Sonam Rapten decided to restore the practice of Jampal Zilnon, involving complex rites, recitations, costumes and ritual sacred dance, which had been a tradition at the time of the Third Dalai Lama but discontinued during the reign of the Fourth. As Sonam Rapten became preoccupied with the looming Tibetan civil war implementation of the project was delegated to Jaisang Depa. In 1655 and for several years he was put in charge of another project to make numerous statues of various lamas and deities with the help of a team of Nepalese artists. In 1659 Nechung Chogyal (gnas chung chos rgyal) through its oracle advised Lobzang Gyatso to have an image of Dorje Drolo (rdo rje gro lod), a manifestation of Guru Rinpoche, made and installed in the Gonkhang (mgon khang) of his room for his own wellbeing and Jaisang Depa was tasked with organising this. Then in 1660 a retreat house was to be built at the gorge of Phagri (phag ri) and Jaisang Depa made it a compulsory service to transport the wood there from Yung Dargye Ling (g.yung dar rgyas gling). He also made the rough design for a fenced courtyard for the retreat house. At the same time, he was charged with raising funds for the preparation of a large quantity of precious medicine for fever being made by Pontshang Changngo (dpon tshang byang ngos) and he supervised the physician Lhagsam (drung 'tsho lhag bsam) in gathering all the necessary medicinal substances.

In 1652, Sonam Rapten made him Head of Delegation and Joint Treasurer of Lobzang Gyatso's historic visit to the Manchu Imperial Court in Beijing. In China, he was given gifts by the emperor as a noble, along with other members of the entourage.

In 1654 on returning to Lhasa from China he requested Lobzang Gyatso to write a text on making tsha-tshas, small votive images.

In 1658 the news that Sonam Rapten was seriously ill, two days before his death, was broken to Lobzang Gyatso through Jaisang Depa.

In 1659 when the rebellion of Depa Norbu and his associates became known, Lobzang Gyatso summoned Jaisang Depa and other aides to a council of war which resolved to send an expeditionary force to Shigatse. During the standoff, when the two Mongol chieftains arrived at Shigatse fort and parleyed with the two main rebels, the rebels, taking the Mongols for mediators, alleged that they, the Mongols, had been misled by the doings of Jaisang Depa and other senior officials in Lhasa. The rebels eventually gave up, however, and dispersed without a fight in the spring of 1660.

In the fourth month of 1660 Nechung Chogyal urged Lobzang Gyatso to go into strict retreat as, following the death of Sonam Rapten, he was becoming unduly distracted by political duties. He discussed this with Jaisang Depa and other senior officials and it was decided that Lobzang Gyatso should start by reducing his busy periods and delegate such duties, dictating decisions briefly to Jaisang Depa and giving further clarification when necessary.

== Appointment as Regent ==
From the spring of 1660 senior officials had been expressing their opinions, verbally and in writing, that Jaisang Depa was the best candidate to be appointed as the next Depa, following Depa Norbu's fall from grace. The Mongol King, Tenzin Dayan Khan (bstan 'dzin da la'i han) wrote to Lobzang Gyatso on the subject and Jinon (ji nong) and the Mongol prince Hung Taiji (hung tha'i ji) also urged him to make a decision, saying "We want you to complete the process of enthronement of the Depa before we leave for Kokonor. People regard Depa Norbu, Sepo (sras po) and Jaisang Depa as the best of all, but the first two are no longer acceptable. Thus no other person is more acceptable than Jaisang Depa." After discussion Lobzang Gyatso made the decision, inviting the King from Dam and sending his chamberlain to inform Jaisang Depa of his appointment. He declined twice, saying it would hinder his spiritual practice, but on the third request he accepted the office of Regent.

The Scottish scholar Hugh Richardson indicated that Jaisang Depa might not have been Lobzang Gyatso's first choice because he had relied on Dronnyer Drungpa (mgron gnyer drung pa) as his right-hand man since Sonam Rapten's death, but there is little or no evidence to be found in the autobiography to support this contention.

Jaisang Depa was ceremonially enthroned at Gaden Yangtse Monastery on the 13th of the 7th month, 1660, and Lobzang Gyatso conferred the title of Sakyong (Depa) on him and the name Trinle Gyatso, the same as his birth name. A new seal was created for him and its first imprints were offered to the Jowo Buddha at Lhasa's Jokhang temple and other important statues, and many other special rituals were carried out over the following month.

Jaisang Depa's appointment as Regent Trinle Gyatsho is also referred to later in Lobsang Gyatso's 1679 decree appointing Sangye Gyatsho as his sixth Regent, a copy of which, bearing Lobzang Gyatso's handprint, can still be seen [by the steps of the Potala]. Referring to the time when the Mongol King Gushri Khan had eliminated all the enemies of the Geluk, he writes:

"At that time, in the Water-horse year [1642], when all the people especially the subjects of the palace of Samdruptse (Bsam-'grub-rtse) and also the king's own lineage, were set under me by a religious offering of selfless generosity, since I was unable by myself to undertake the government in both the religious and the temporal sphere, after the Depa Sonam Rapten (sde-pa Bsod-nams rab-brtan) had carried out the task of regent for secular affairs [from 1642 to 1658] as all members of his family had died I appointed Depa Trinle Gyatsho (Sde-pa 'Phrin-las rgya mtsho) and others in succession to bear that responsibility."

In fact, in between Sonam Rapten and Trinle Gyatsho, Lobzang Gyatsho had also appointed the former's younger brother Depa Norbu as Regent in 1659 but Norbu had soon rebelled and had been vanquished in the spring of 1660; he was also still alive at the time, but evidently no longer eligible for the post.

== Activities as Regent ==
Jaisang Depa, or Depa Trinle Gyatso as he was now generally known, is said by Richardson to have controlled the civil administration of the government and the country from his appointment in 1660 until his death in 1668.

Little of consequence is recorded about his work as Regent in the autobiography, however. It seems he employed astrology in his decision-making process; for example, for a year, two officers had clashed over the position of provisional commander in Tsang and on a certain day in 1661 the Depa settled the dispute by appointing one of them according to the stars' positions.

Later in 1661, while reviewing the grants of estates in general, and without being requested by Trinle Gyatso, to support his household Lobzang Gyatso decided to grant him two additional estates, Paltrong (dpal grong) and Triblung (grib lung), comprising 50 households and an income of 2,500 bushels of grain.

Early during his tenure as Regent the first Europeans entered Lhasa: the Jesuits Albert d'Orville and Johannes Grueber arrived there in 1661 and referred to Jaisang Depa as the "King" and "the brother of God the Father [Lobzang Gyatso]," who treated them kindly. The Jesuits stayed two months and Grueber reported that the king, with the title of Deva [Depa], was descended from an ancient race of Tangut Tatars and resided at the Butala [Potala], a castle on a hill, as in Europe, with a numerous court; it was he, wrote Grueber, who carried on the government. Grueber also sketched what he saw and his efforts were later converted into plates in Kircher's China Illustrata, published in Amsterdam in 1667. These included a life drawing of Jaisang 'Deva', made at his own request, in which he appears shaven-headed and in monk's robes (see thumbnail image, top right).

In his autobiography, many of Lobzang Gyatso's references to Trinle Gyatso during his Regency refer to his arrangements concerning the monks, creating statues and making offerings. For example, in 1661, not long after his appointment Depa Trinle Gyatso thought that if there were too many monks at Chokor Ling College there would be little development, but if there were too many it would reduce the rations provided by the Treasury for the Drepung monks. Lobzang Gyatso observed this as an example of his general narrow-mindedness and suggested he went to Tagten Monastery, which Trinle Gyatso did, hurriedly, 'like a prisoner getting out of prison'. In 1662, Trinle Gyatso arranged to make new crowns for sacred images for the Jowo Buddha in the Jokhang, and a mandala, as had been wished for by Lobzang Gyatso who had been unable to organise it himself. Late in 1663 the Depa undertook an important project of creating 1,000 images of the Buddha, which took nearly five years to complete. In the same year he arranged for offerings to be made to large bronze statues in the assembly halls and in the rooms of the old and new palaces, and to smaller Chinese-made statues. He also distributed large quantities of materials as donations, including gold and silver to the monks. Also in 1663, Trinle Gyatso renovated the Barkor (bar skor), the inner circumambulation path of the Jokhang (jo khang) temple in Lhasa. In 1664, Trinle Gyatso wanted to have statues of the Four Lokapalas made in the vestibule leading to the main entrance of the Jokhang temple courtyard in Lhasa and they were made by eight sculptors. At the same time, he was having a new temple built at Chuzang (chu bzang) in Nyangtren with various images of the Buddha and other enlightened beings and towards the end of the year Lobzang Gyatso carried out an elaborate consecration ceremony, inserting the dharani contents for the images.

In 1663, trouble broke out at Kongtsetun (kong rtse bstun) in Kham and there was a debate about sending a force to tackle it; the Depa was in doubt, so divinations were made and spirits were consulted, giving positive responses. He therefore left Lhasa with a force and reached Zichenthang (gzi chen thang) but what resulted is not recorded by Lobzang Gyatso in his autobiography, except that they returned within a month.

In conclusion, Lobzang Gyatso's autobiography provides little or no reference to Trinle Gyatso's political activities but whether this is due to his lack of political involvement or to the former's lack of concern with recording worldly affairs - or, alternatively to his handling of important political matters himself - is not clear. Tucci comments that while Trinle Gyatso appeared to be concerned with the dedication of temples and as a patron of other pious works, his political interference was non-existent. This observation is in accord with Karmay's account that the "ever increasing diplomatic activities of the Fifth Dalai Lama, often dictated by the circumstances of the day, covered not only the whole of the Tibetan world, Mongolia, Ladakh and Bhutan but also extended a far as China." This statement is expanded by Karmay in some detail and covers Lobzang Gyatso's political activities, both domestic and international, before, during and after Depa Trinle Gyatso's entire reign as Regent without ever having to mention his name.

Early in 1668 Trinle Gyatso died and once again Lobzang Gyatso took over the civil administration of the country pending his appointment of the next Regent, Lobzang Tutop.

== Sources ==
- Karmay, Samten G. (Translator) (2014). Trulwai Roltsai; The Illusive Play ["Dukula"]: The Autobiography of the Fifth Dalai Lama. Serindia Publications. Chicago. ISBN 978-1-932476675.
- Karmay, Samten G. (2009). The Arrow and the Spindle, Studies in History, Myths, Rituals and Beliefs in Tibet. Revised edition. Kathmandu, Nepal, Mandala Book Point. ISBN 9789994655106.
- Richardson, Hugh E. (1998) High Peaks, Pure Earth; Collected Writings on Tibetan History and Culture. Serindia Publications, London. ISBN 0906026466
- Shakabpa, Tsepon W.D. (1967), Tibet: A Political History. New York: Yale University Press, and (1984), Singapore: Potala Publications. ISBN 0961147415.
- Shakabpa, Tsepon W.D. (2010). One Hundred Thousand Moons. An Advanced Political History of Tibet (2 volumes). Leiden (Netherlands), Boston (USA): Brill's Tibetan Studies Library. ISBN 9789004177321.
- Tucci, Giuseppe. (1949). Tibetan Painted Scrolls. Rome: La Libreria dello Stato, vol. 1
- Lobsang Gyatso, ngag dbang blo bzang rgya mtsho, Fifth Dalai Lama (1679). Autobiography, Good Silk Cloth, 3 vols., rang rnam du kü la'i gos bzang, TBRC W175. Volume III, fo. 128a, Handprint Proclamation on the Triple Steps of the Potala Palace, rtse pho brang po tā la’i gsum skas ‘go’i rtsi tshig phyag rjes ma.
