= Sonam Rapten =

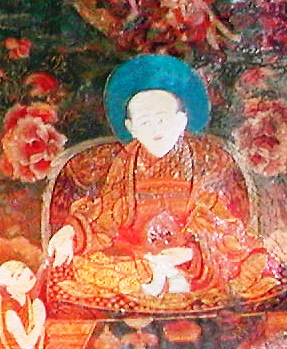
Sonam Rapten (bsod nams rab brtan), from a mural at Samye Monastery, Tibet. Photo: F. Pommaret 2005

Sönam Rapten (bsod nams rab brtan; 1595–1658), initially known as Gyalé Chödze and later on as Sönam Chöpel, was born in the Tholung valley in the Central Tibetan province of Ü. He started off as a monk-administrator (las sne, lené) of the Ganden Phodrang, the early Dalai Lamas' residence at Drepung Monastery, outside Lhasa, Tibet. From around or before the age of 20 he became the Treasurer and the "Chagdzo" (phyag mdzod - the personal manager and principal attendant) of the Fourth (1589-1617) and, subsequently, the Fifth Dalai Lama (1617-1682). He presided as the most senior official of the Gelugpa school of Tibetan Buddhism for over 40 years (circa 1615–1658).

The Gelugpa school was twice threatened with extinction in the first half of his tenure, in 1618 and again in 1634. Despite this, under Sonam Rapten's leadership, and thanks to both Mongol military assistance and the pre-eminence of his Ruler the Fifth Dalai Lama as a spiritual leader, the Gelugpa rose to govern most of Greater Tibet by the time he reached 47 years old (1642). Subject to intermittent interference from neighbouring countries, the government he helped to found continued to rule at least the main area of Central Tibet for over 300 years.

After the civil war of 1641-42 and until his death in 1658 Sonam Rapten acted as de facto ruler of Tibet with the title of Depa (Viceroy, Regent, Ruler or Prime Minister). He was an uncompromising proponent of the Gelugpa tradition.

== Early life ==
Sonam Rapten was born in 1595 at Gyale in Tibbetan Tolung valley, to the west of Lhasa. By 1603, when he was 8, he was enrolled at the greatest Gelugpa monastery, Drepung. Being born in Gyale, he was called 'Gyale Chodze'. Chodze (chos mdzad) signifies 'monk-sponsor', one whose family makes substantial donations to the monastery, thus exempting him from the menial duties of ordinary monks. Therefore, he probably came from a prosperous family. He is first mentioned in the Fifth Dalai Lama's biography of the Fourth Dalai Lama as a Ganden Phodrang Chodze, at the age of eight, being listed amongst others welcoming the Fourth Dalai Lama when he first arrived in Lhasa from Mongolia in 1603.

=== 4th Dalai Lama's Attendant and Ganden Phodrang Treasurer ===
He first rose to prominence as Principal Attendant (Chagdzo) of the Fourth Dalai Lama and Treasurer (mdzod-pa), i.e. the senior official, of the Ganden Phodrang, the Dalai Lamas' residence, 'a monastery within a monastery' which had been constructed at Drepung in 1518 for the Second Dalai Lama by the Phagmodrupa King Drakpa Jungne. He is next mentioned (in the same biography) as 'Chagdzo Sonam Rapten' in a context where he is charged with overseeing the funeral service of an important lama. By the time he was about 20 he was already the senior official of the Gelugpa school.

== The Panchen Lama's prediction ==
Just after the Fourth Dalai Lama's death, early in 1617, the same biography refers to a significant discussion that Sonam Chopel had at the age of 21 with the Panchen Lama who had been invited to go to Ngari; he had to pass through Shigatse and Rapten, concerned about the opposing power of the King of Tsang being a threat to his safety on the way, tried to dissuade him. The account says that the Panchen Lama mentioned a Nyingma prophecy that Mongolians would invade Tibet and suggested that the late, once-powerful Fourth Dalai Lama would have been able to prevent it. He still hoped for peace and before leaving he exhorted Sonam Rapten to work for peace.

This discussion presages the later arrival of the Mongolian Gushri Khan and his army, brought to Tibet by Sonam Rapten 17 years later to support the Gelugpa cause. However, Sonam Rapten did not 'work for peace'. Gushri helped destroy the power of the Tsang dynasty forever in the 1641–42 civil war that was primarily provoked by Sonam Rapten (see below). From then on, Sonam Rapten exercised secular power over all or most of Tibet as the Fifth Dalai Lama's regent, with the Dalai Lama as the titular head of government.

== Part played in the 1618 Tsangpa attack on Lhasa ==
Due to old political rivalry between the Tsangpa regime (and before them the Rinpungpa) and the Phagmodrupa dynasty in Ü which had come to support the Gelug, the 1617 death of the Fourth Dalai Lama emboldened the King of Tsang, Karma Tenkyong, to raise a large army and march from Shigatse to attack Lhasa by early 1618, when Sonam Rapten was just 22. His forces proceeded to plunder and wreck Lhasa's great Gelugpa monasteries, especially Drepung, killing hundreds of monks and forcing the rest to flee for their lives to the north. Many civilians were also slaughtered; all the local, Gelugpa-sympathetic Kyishö nobility's estates were captured; the Lhasa valley governor and his son had to flee to Tsokha; and many Gelugpa monasteries were forcibly converted into Kagyü institutions. When the Tsang regime crowned the Tenth Karmapa as spiritual leader of all Tibet later that year, religious consolidation under the leadership of the Karma Kagyü order together with suppression of the Gelug became established Tsangpa policy.

As part of a resolution negotiated by Chöjé Taklung, Ganden Phodrang's representative Sonam Rapten, being treasurer, had to arrange a ransom payment for the sacked monasteries of Drepung and Sera. He had to deliver, under escort, 300 gold coins (200 for Drepung and 100 for Sera) to Tsang, to the west of Lhasa. Since both monasteries' funds had been exhausted, the resourceful Sonam Rapten said he would have to collect the gold from the previous Dalai Lamas' secret reserve at 'Gyel', or Chokkor Gyel. This monastery, built by the Second Dalai Lama near Lhamo Lhatso 'Oracle Lake', is a few days journey to the east. It was agreed, but then, soon after leaving Lhasa for Gyel, Sonam Rapten evaded his Tsangpa escort and went to Mongolia via Nyangtö and Kongpo.

== Discovery of the Fifth Dalai Lama ==
In Dukula, the 5th Dalai Lama's autobiography volume I, Sonam Rapten is first mentioned as taking up residence in the Ganden Phodrang in 1621. In the meantime, since the 1618 incidents he had secretly searched for and identified the reincarnation of the Fourth Dalai Lama. Then, in 1619, in the face of active hostility from the King of Tsang he secretly traveled to Kokonor to seek military support from the Mongol leaders there, returning to the Ganden Phodrang in 1621 as confirmed in the Dukula.

Having been the Fourth Dalai Lama's Chagdzo at a young age, after his death early in 1617 Sonam Rapten had been "anxiously searching for the reincarnation of the omniscient Fourth Dalai Lama", despite the Tsangpa King placing a ban upon the search. At this time the King, under the influence of the older sects and bearing a personal grudge against the Fourth Dalai Lama, actively opposed the Gelugpa school. Preventing the re-discovery of their most popular and important lama would have been a major drawback, "the most cruel blow" for the Gelugpa, effectively "blocking the foundation of the emerging political and spiritual spirit and stamina of Ganden Phodrang and Gelugpa supremacy". The Gelugpa did not renounce the search, however; in defiance of the ban, Sonam Rapten and his team after covertly consulting two oracles for pointers secretly identified the probable reincarnation, a boy who had been born late in 1617 at Chonggyé in the Yarlung Valley. This discovery was made in 1619.

=== Secret Confirmation by senior lamas' divinations ===
It was 1620 and tension between the powerful Tsangpa faction and the Gelugpa in Lhasa and their Mongolian allies was building up again. After Sonam Rapten's secret visit to Kokonor, Mongol soldiers had filtered back into Tibet and eventually succeeded in making a surprise attack on the Tsangpa's military camps in Lhasa. Soon, by the timely intervention of the Panchen Lama and the Ganden Tripa further hostilities were avoided and a favourable peace treaty was negotiated. It was then decided that the Panchen Lama and Lingmé Zhapdrung should draw lots to choose the child. They went to Radeng monastery to divine by the dough-ball method which of the three candidates was the reincarnation. Lots were ritually drawn before the sacred image of Jowo Jampel Dorjé, and Sonam Rapten's candidate, Künga Migyur from Chonggyé, was duly chosen. Meanwhile, the Panchen Lama had also lobbied the Tsangpa King to lift the ban on finding the Fifth Dalai Lama.

==== Ban lifted, appointed to chagdzo ====
Hostilities having ceased, the ban was lifted and the tulku was duly installed at Drepung monastery in 1622 in his 5th year and given the new name of Lobsang Gyatso. From that time on, Sonam Rapten, 22 years his senior, was his chagdzo (guardian, manager and chief attendant) and eventually, from 1642, his viceroy or prime minister - the Desi, de facto ruler of Tibet.

==== Different accounts of object-recognition test ====
There are differing accounts concerning at what point the young Fifth Dalai Lama candidate was subjected to an object-recognition test. This involved him being asked by an official to choose or identify certain personal items that had belonged to his predecessor from a selection of objects which included other items that had not. The accounts also differ about the place where the test took place, whether his eventual tutor Kachuwa or Sonam Rapten carried it out and also whether the candidate passed the test.

Those sources which assert that Sonam Rapten personally subjected the boy to the test early, before he left Chonggyé and before lots were drawn at Radeng also say that he passed the test without hesitation. The account on the Dalai Lama's official website concurs with this version.

In ‘’Dukula’’, however, the Fifth Dalai Lama himself recalls that the tests were done after lots had been drawn, that they took place at Nakartse and he frankly admits "I could utter no words to recognise [any of the objects]". This does not rule out the possibility that he did recognise them but was unable to say so. He witnesses that in any case, when his examiner Kachuwa went out of the room to report the result to the other officials he declared "I am absolutely convinced that he recognised the objects". Mullin's account concurs with this version, being taken from the same source.

It is also quite possible from these accounts that the test was carried out twice, once by Sonam Rapten before lots were drawn, when the infant was too young to recall the test, and also, according with Tibetan lore, still young enough to retain the memory of the objects from his previous life; and once by Kachuwa afterwards when he was old enough to remember the occasion of the test later, but, according to Tibetan lore, at the time unable or not young enough to remember the objects from his previous life.

== Relations with Fifth Dalai Lama, 1622-1658 ==
When the Fifth Dalai Lama, aged 4, was installed at Drepung in 1622 it was Sonam Rapten as head administrator of the Ganden Phodrang who became his Chagdzo, Principal Attendant, responsible for his upbringing, management and safety. It is normal practice for an important lama's Chagdzo to exercise more or less total control over his charge in childhood and often to maintain such control long after the lama's maturity, dominating him and running all his affairs, as Sonam Rapten did. In case of the lama's death, the Chagdzo is often placed in charge of the search for his reincarnation, as Sonam Rapten had done earlier as the Fourth Dalai Lama's former chagdzo when the latter died. Amongst other duties the Chagdzo controls all the money and property and is referred to as the 'treasurer'. He takes care of public relations, controlling who can and who cannot have an audience with the lama. He organises the lama's travels, accommodations, building and publishing projects and all the lama's engagements, including his private and public teachings, and Sonam Rapten took care of all such work with consummate skill.

The Chagdzo also takes care of the lama's family affairs. For example, in 1626 the Dalai Lama's father, Dudul Rapten (aka Hor Dudul Dorjé) died, possibly murdered, in the prison of the Tsangpa King, without having seen his son since he was an infant. His corpse was thrown out behind Zamkhar Castle and "a sage from Chonggyé took the body away". It was Sonam Rapten who took responsibility to arrange for the proper and necessary funeral rites to be performed on Dudul Rapten's behalf at local monasteries.

Sonam Rapten, being a monk also sometimes gave spiritual advice to the boy, although he was not one of his formal religious tutors. In 1626 Sonam Rapten saw the 8 year old Dalai Lama was becoming interested in a text on Hayagriva so he referred him to Lingmé Zhapdrung Konchog Chophel, the 35th Ganden Tripa, who began to mentor him on this subject.

=== Responsibility for all affairs of state ===
Rapten was a dynamic character and in practice, on a day-to-day basis more powerful than his master, dealing with nobles, royalty and political leaders including foreign ones and routinely making critical decisions in all matters without reference to the Dalai Lama. In 1641, against the lama's wishes he even launched a full-scale civil war. Although Sonam Rapten as 'Regent' is generally accorded the title "Desi" by historians, in practice the 5th Dalai Lama in The Dukula addressed him as "Zhalngo" ('The Presence') and also refers to him as the "Depa", but never as "Desi". The title of Desi was not in use in the time of the Fifth Dalai Lama, "for whom it may have had too strong overtones of independent authority"; it was only applied retroactively to Sonam Rapten and his successors in histories written later.

After the 1641–42 Civil War, the Mongol Gushri Khan (with whose military assistance the Gelugpa had by then defeated the Tsangpa) was content to act as head of security, ready to protect the new regime as and when requested, while Sonam Rapten was responsible for the conduct of secular business. In the Fifth Dalai Lama's later decree appointing Sangye Gyatso as his 'regent' in 1679, he recalls in the preamble that earlier, "Depa Sonam Rapten had carried out the task of regent for all secular affairs".

==== Dalai Lama's habitual deference towards him ====
Moreover, the Fifth Dalai Lama found worldly affairs distasteful and much preferred to study spiritual subjects. He allowed Sonam Rapten to do as he liked, choosing to defer to him as a matter of course. Nevertheless, he somewhat ruefully mentions being ignored or overruled sometimes, e.g. Sonam Rapten's denying his long-time wish to make a new crown for a favourite statue, as it was costly and would earn no recognition; only after Sonam Rapten's funeral in 1659 could he start making the crown. A passage in The Dukula for 1654 laments his frustrations and the extent to which he had to defer to Sonam Rapten's oversight even on spiritual issues; this passage also gives an example and shows Sonam Rapten's younger brother and deputy Depa Norbu's inconsiderate attitude towards him:

"Like the lamas in the past, I just wanted to go and visit the sacred places, seek religious instructions from lamas in whom one had faith and teach others who were suitable disciples, but I had no liberty in doing all this. First, I had to assume the position of an imposter of one whose fame of greatness was nothing but empty, and second, whatever I wanted to do was inconvenient for the public in one way or another. Because of karmic connections, I was under pressure from the power of other people.

"I told the Depa [Sonam Rapten]: "People like to receive the wang [blessing] of longevity. It would be convenient if I could just give a general wang for everybody at one time. He agreed and Depa Norbu began to make a list of fees of wang that would be imposed in accordance with the high and low status of the close attendants and other officials. I felt embarrassed and gave up such an initiation, fearing it would send out the wrong message, to the effect that I would hanker after wealth by levying a tax (on my teachings)."

==== Their rare policy disagreements ====
Over the 36 years they spent working together, from 1622 to 1658, as exceptions prove the rule there were a few instances whereby Sonam Rapten's policies were challenged by the Dalai Lama. Two major examples of this are firstly in 1639-1641 when the latter strongly disagreed with Sonam Rapten's urge to attack the Tsangpa, to no avail, and secondly just as he was leaving Tibet to visit the Shunzhi Emperor of China in 1653 the lama issued a decree to repeal and prohibit any further promulgation of the "gross" sectarian practices carried out under Sonam Rapten's rule, policies which, it appears, might have been in force for a decade (details below).

== 1621: He recruits Mongol fighters ==
After his attack on Lhasa in 1618, the Tsangpa King established military bases to blockade Drepung and Sera monasteries and thus control the city. A year later, the Mongol soldiers expelled from Tibet by the Tsangpa in 1605 started filtering back into Tibet in the guise of pilgrims and camped some distance outside the city. The 23-year-old Sonam Rapten contacted them and kept in clandestine touch hoping to engineer a counter-attack by the Mongols against the Tsangpa camps at some point. It took till 1621, when the Mongol cavalry suddenly attacked and routed the by then complacent Tsangpa. Faced with all-out war as the Mongols prepared to follow up the attack and the Tsangpa king called up reinforcements, the Panchen Lama and the Ganden Tripa skilfully intervened to negotiate a cease-fire and a Tsangpa surrender whereby the remnants of the army returned to Tsang. Moreover, full reparations for the 1618 attack were to be made by the Tsangpa and Sonam Rapten was 'allowed' to remain at the Ganden Phodrang. In 1622, the old Tsangpa King was succeeded by his young son, allowing Sonam Rapten to reveal the four year old Fifth Dalai Lama who was brought out of hiding and installed at Drepung. When the Mongols demanded to take him away to Mongolia, Sonam Rapten and his helpers had to hide him away in southern Tibet for another year.

His young charge was made Abbot of Drepung and became immersed in his studies, so Sonam Rapten who managed the affairs of monastery on his behalf became used to wielding the power of the throne behind the scenes.

== Mongol campaigns in Tibet, 1632-1638 ==
The Tsangpa King Püntsok Namgyel died in 1620 or 1621 and was succeeded by his son Karma Tenkyong Wangpo. Even more belligerent and sectarian than his father, after a relatively peaceful decade he resolved to extend his rule and persecuted Gelugpa monasteries wherever he could. To ensure ultimate victory, in 1632 he started assembling 'an army from the thirteen myriarchies [of Tibet]' and eventually enlisted Choghtu Khong Tayiji and Ligden Khan, leaders of the fierce, anti-Gelugpa Chahar and Khalkha Mongol tribes, as allies. They plotted to invade Tibet, attack the Gelugpa and 'wipe them out' with the help of the Bonpo King of Beri in Kham and the army of the Tsangpa King. Hearing of this, the Gelugpa abbots and patrons, in a panic, realising the defenceless Gelugpa school was threatened with attacks by these powerful forces from three different sides, convened an emergency meeting with Sonam Rapten to find a way to prevent the extinction of their sect. The Khalkha and Bön Donyo were already attempting to join forces with the Tsangpa 'to obstruct commercial traffic and pilgrimage routes and to steal from pilgrims'. The very existence of the Gelugpa was felt to be like "a butter-lamp flickering in the wind".

This crucial conference was held at the historic house called Chudingné where the patrons of the Ganden Phodrang would gather. They made offerings to the Lamo Tsangpa Oracle, seeking a divination to resolve their plight. The Oracle advised them, 'because of their powerlessness', to go and ask the four Oirat Mongol tribes for help.

The meeting therefore resolved that Sonam Rapten and Garu Lotsawa should go to Mongolia to solicit these tribes, who were Gelugpa converts, to come to their aid. By 1634 Sonam Rapten had recruited the Oirats, Dzungars and Urluks, who were just as fierce as the Khalkhas and Chahars and who vowed to assist. Together the tribal leaders deputed Gushri Khan, Chief of the Oirat Khoshut tribe to lead a combined Gelugpa Mongol army to Tibet in defence of the Gelugpa. Sonam Rapten returned to Lhasa with the good news and Gushri Khan travelled to Tibet disguised as a pilgrim to reconnoitre the situation. In the resulting campaigns over the next 4 years he and his army eliminated all his anti-Gelugpa Mongol rivals, meanwhile becoming a devoted 'heart-disciple' of the Dalai Lama. At a ceremony hosted by the Dalai Lama in Lhasa in 1638 the victorious Gushri was then honoured as a 'Religious king and defender of Buddhism'.

== Architect of the Gelugpa/Mongol conquest of Tibet ==
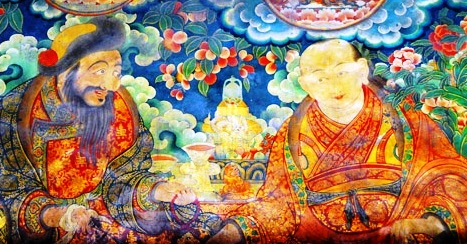
Gushri Khan and Sonam Rapten. From a mural at the Jokhang Temple, Lhasa. Photo: Brian J. McMorrow

Sonam Rapten, however, was not satisfied. He was now determined to launch the victorious ally Gushri and his Mongol army against the burgeoning Lhasa Gelugpa's two main deadly political and religious rivals and enemies: Donyo Dorje, Bonpo King of Beri in Do Kham in the east, and then the Tsangpa regime to the west. Donyo Dorje had not only persecuted all the Buddhist schools but he was alleged to have made a pact with the Tsangpa to attack the Lhasa Gelugpa from both sides to crush and destroy them once and for all. Gushri Khan was ready to do as Sonam Rapten proposed but the Fifth Dalai Lama forbade it. He ruled that there had been enough bloodshed already and it was not necessary to compete with and attack other Tibetan leaders or parties.

=== He defies the Dalai Lama by going to war ===
The politically ambitious Sonam Rapten, however, insisted on taking advantage of the availability of Gushri and his victorious army to establish a greater Gelugpa supremacy. He rejected the Dalai Lama's wish for peaceful co-existence; saying the Gelugpa had been unduly persecuted, his vision for peace was to forcibly unite the country under the titular leadership of the Fifth Dalai Lama instead of letting it remain fragmented under different warlords and religious leaders. Maintaining that all the Gelugpa had lacked was a strong backer, he was insistent that full use should be made of Gushri Khan's devoted military support while it was available.

The powerful Bonpo King of Beri, Donyo Dorje was inimical towards all Buddhists and had killed and imprisoned many monks and laymen of all schools in Chamdo. In the summer of 1639, Sonam Rapten, in front of the Dalai Lama and without consulting him, told Kachu Genyen Dondrub to go to Güshri Khan with clear instructions to destroy Beri and then return to his base in Amdo, adding ‘no further conflicts would interest us’. When the messenger departed, however, Sonam Rapten accompanied him on his way, stopping at Chabtengkha to speak alone with him "for the period of two tea-times".

By the end of 1640 the Beri King had been defeated and killed after a hard-fought campaign. To proclaim and celebrate Güshri's victory Sonam Rapten hoisted flags of good tidings in the four directions around Lhasa and caused the "Great Banner of Power and Fortune" to be raised at the central western gate of Lhasa called Sapokgang.

Sonam Rapten soon proposed that Güshri Khan should now march to Tsang with his army and attack the King, but the Dalai Lama disagreed, saying he did not want any more people killed. After defeating Donyo Dorje and releasing the prisoners, the Dalai Lama wanted Gushri to return direct to Mongolia, taking his army with him, as Rapten had arranged. Sonam Rapten, however, had already deceived the Dalai Lama by covertly sending to Güshri Khan additional verbal instructions with Kachu Genyen Dondrub to go and destroy the Tsangpa and Kagyu establishment after dealing with the Beri King. Referring to Sonam Rapten's underhand trick, it occurred to the infuriated Dalai Lama that "the trill of the flute" - his message of peace - had changed into "the whistle of an arrow" - instructions for war - when Rapten had talked privately to the messenger. This refers to the traditional Tibetan practice, in a situation requiring secrecy, to give the courier an additional oral message that contradicts and overrides the written one.

The two argued at length inconclusively and finally the Dalai Lama instructed Sonam Rapten to carry out a dice divination, which he did before the deity Pelden. The result indicated that an attack on the Tsangpa now would succeed, but that in the long term it would be harmful. Sonam Rapten declared "If the strategy is successful, that is enough because in the long run everyone dies". Therefore, he took the short-term view and consented to Gushri's attack on Tsang.

==== Civil War between Lhasa and Tsang, 1641-42 ====
Having executed the Beri King at Chamdo and subdued Do Kham, early in 1641 Gushri followed his instructions and Rapten sent Tardongnas, a capable and high-ranking official to guide him to Shigatse. The Tsangpa forces were forewarned, however. The King had not gone to the aid of his ally Donyo Dorje when Güshri Khan eliminated him, but now he set to organising his defence. The borders posts were guarded, the most valiant soldiers were kept at Shigatse, supplies, arms and ammunition were stockpiled and a huge stockade was erected around the castle and the monastery. By the time Güshri got there they were so well prepared that his men could not break the siege after a whole year of trying. Sonam Rapten had been busy travelling around Ü province to take over or harass areas ruled by the Tsangpa and he heard from his informers about Gushri's failure to capture the fort. He sent a spy inside the fort in disguise and he reported that the defences were so strong that it would be impossible to break the siege. Rapten then contritely asked the Dalai Lama to go and mediate a settlement but the Lama, infuriated again, spoke harshly to him for the first time, blaming him for the whole mess and saying it was now far too late: "We now must go through with this war, which you have so carelessly begun", he concluded.

Stung into action, Sonam Rapten raised an army of Tibetans and captured the Dongkar Castle in one day with the help of monks from Sera and Drepung. Seeing this, a whole series of other Tsangpa-held forts surrendered one after the other. He dropped Lhasa's thinly veiled pretence of neutrality in the siege and marched on Shigatse to join Gushri with fresh provisions, fodder and weapons, helping the construction of 'giant catapults'. The siege efforts intensified and by early spring of 1642 the Tsangpa defences were broken. The King and his two main ministers capitulated and all three were imprisoned. At this point the Dalai Lama was invited to come for the inauguration of his rule over Tibet in the great assembly hall of Samdruptse castle and the victorious Gushri and Rapten rode out to meet him, two days journey from Shigatse.

==== The final elimination of Tsangpa power ====
Soon after this conclusion Garpon Yapse, a follower of the Karmapa, fomented a major new uprising against the new government. His rapidly growing army captured the town of Gyantse and inspired a major rebellion in the region of Kongpo. Sonam Rapten and Gushri Khan had to quell the revolt, their forces killing 7,000 to 8,000 rebels in one place and capturing many more. They then moved around southern Tibet mopping up resistance and residual rebel forces. In the course of this they captured the official cook of the Karmapa, one Jama Chöying, who was found to be wearing an amulet which contained details of a plan to eliminate the new government and replace it with Tsangpa and Karmapa supporters. It was a letter attached to an order of the Karmapa saying that Güshri Khan and Sonam Rapten were to be assassinated and the Panchen Lama and the Dalai Lama imprisoned in Kongpo. As a result, the captured Tsangpa king and his chief ministers, the last vestiges of Tsangpa and Kagyu power in Tibet, were executed by the enraged Gushri Khan by being sewn up in ox-hides and thrown in the Tsangpo river, a sentence reserved in Tibet for rebellious nobles. Thus, the people experienced peace at last and after a long campaign the Karma Kagyud and the Tsangpa met the end of their rule of Central Tibet at the hands of Sonam Rapten, who "manipulated and blended with such subtlety, skill and intricacy the charisma of the Dalai Lama with the military might of the Mongols".

Following this total elimination of regional rival powers by the Lhasa Gelugpa aided by their Mongol warriors, the administration of the entire country was fundamentally re-organised by "the brilliant trio" of the "Great Fifth" Dalai Lama, Sonam Rapten and Gushri Khan.

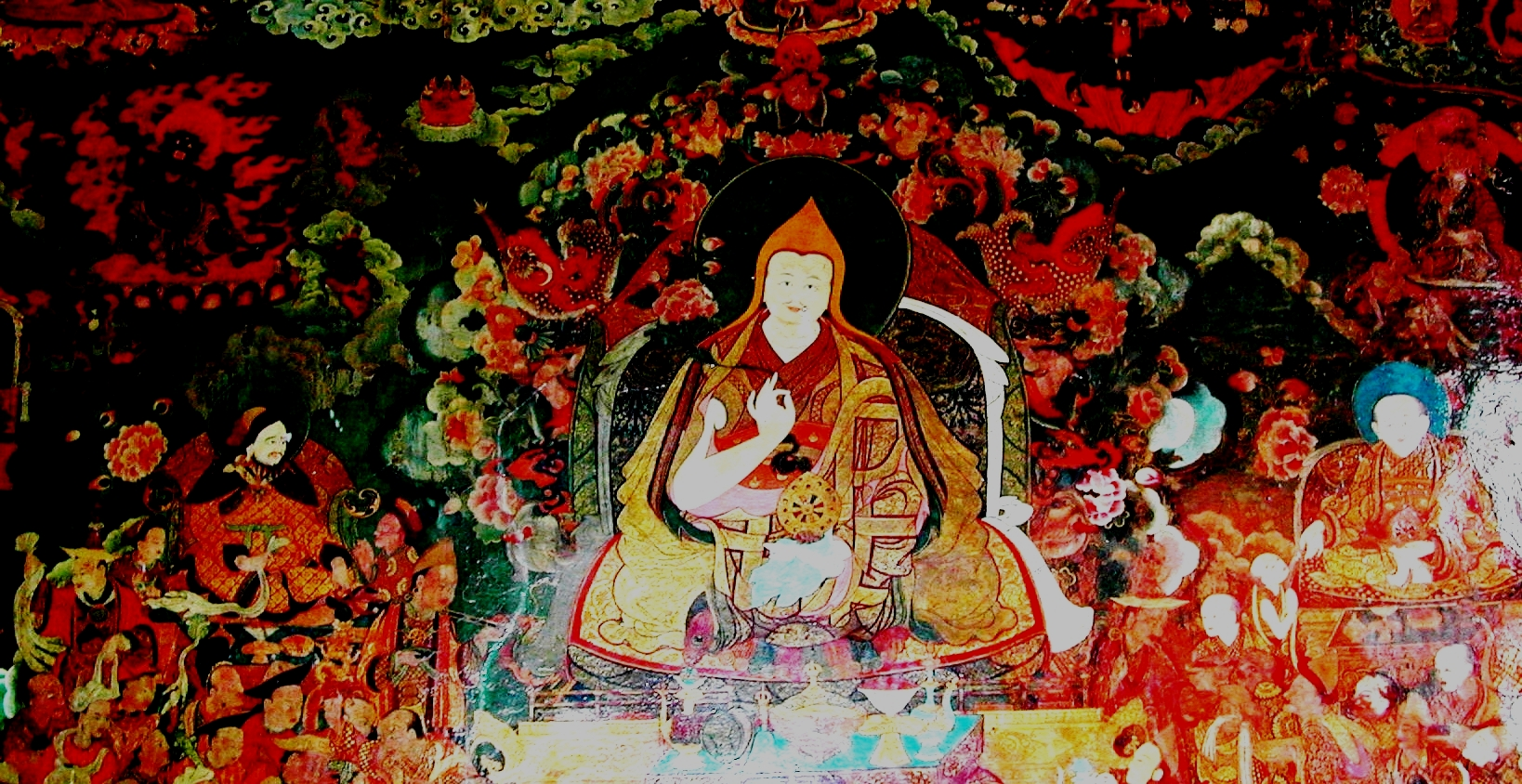
Mural at Samye Monastery showing (left) Gushri Khan, (centre) the Fifth Dalai Lama and (right) Sonam Rapten. Photo: F. Pommaret

== Name change from 'Rapten' to 'Chöphel' ==
It is stated in Kadrung Nornang's text Record of Ten Thousand Years that, after the 1642 completion of the Gelugpa/Mongol conquest of Tibet and at the time of Sonam Rapten's assumption of "the leadership of the government as regent",

"he was known as Chakdzö Sönam Rapten or Tsenzhen Gyalé Chödzé. Subsequently, he changed his name to Sönam Chöpel. So the three names refer to one person. When he became the regent he was called the emperor of the world."

In Dukula, whenever the Fifth refers to him by name instead of title ('Zhalngo') he always uses 'Sonam Rapten'. Apart from Richardson, who follows the Fifth's example, most other sources, including Shakabpa, Dhondup and Mullin, always refer to him by his later name of 'Sönam Chöphel' or similar. It is suggested by Richardson that perhaps the name-change was effected by Güshri Khan in 1637 on the occasion of titles being exchanged between the Tibetan and Mongolian leaders, however there is no mention of this in the sources, on the contrary it is stated that the title conferred on Rapten on that occasion was "Dalai Chagdzo". According to the above quoted text the change to 'Chöpel' took place in 1642.

== De facto ruler of Tibet ==
Sonam Rapten "assumed the leadership of the government as the regent under the Dalai Lama" as soon as the latter had been commonly acknowledged as titular head of state by the assembled Tibetan and Mongolian leaders and masses in a solemn ceremony held at Samdruptse (Shigatse) castle in April, 1642.

Some accounts say Gushri Khan was "King of Tibet" and that Rapten was 'proclaimed by Gushri Khan as regent, responsible for political administration'. Stein goes so far as to say that he was nominated by Gushri as a governor and 'imposed' on the Dalai Lama. According to Richardson, Petech asserts Gushri appointed Rapten as 'minister-regent' to conduct civil affairs even before he 'offered the sovereignty to the Dalai Lama'; also that Tucci thought this was Gushri's way of controlling Tibet through Rapten, setting the stage for a power struggle between Gushri and a "crafty and ambitious" Dalai Lama; Tucci even describes Rapten as 'an insignificant character whom the Dalai Lama had no difficulty in dominating'. Richardson, however, considered it difficult to reconcile Rapten's unremittingly domineering pro-Gelugpa activity pre-1642 with a sudden lapse into nonentity from that date on. Mullin also characterises the Dalai Lama's role as that of a 'figurehead', while Sonam Rapten acted as 'de facto ruler' and only referred matters to the Dalai Lama on major issues or when he was in doubt; which was not very often.

The accounts of Stein, Petech and Tucci are also offset by the facts that firstly, Rapten's successors (Depa Norbu, Trinley Gyatso, Lozang Thutop, Lozang Jinpa and Sangye Gyatso) were all appointed by the Dalai Lama himself and none of them were as strong as Sonam Rapten.

In the 5th Dalai Lama's autobiography, Dukula, he describes in detail the process of his own assumption of power before the great assembly at Samdruptse castle in 1642 without referring to Güshri Khan as being instrumental in it. In addition there is no reference at all about Sonam Rapten having any change in his previous status as his chagdzo, charged with day-to-day administrative and political matters on his behalf. After describing the assembly of Tibetan and Mongolian leaders and the masses of monks and lay people in the great hall of the castle, the Fifth Dalai Lama simply notes that "With these gifts, it was proclaimed that the political authority over the 13 Myriarchies of Tibet [i.e. the whole of Tibet], led by the estate of Samdruptse, were in their totality offered to me". On the contrary, having returned to Ü the Dalai Lama describes how Rapten exhorted him strongly to stay in Lhasa now (rather than at Drepung) and take over more political responsibilities from him, whilst still offering to continue to serve him and 'not do less than before'. The Dalai Lama, feeling "if only I could devote myself to [religious/philosophical] study", responded by flatly refusing to deal with anything administrative or political since he had "no capacity of doing anything, either mentally or physically". The Dukula, which is normally quite detailed and specific in such matters, there is no indication that Sonam Rapten underwent any change of status, duty or responsibility, during or after the Dalai Lama's assumption of full political and religious power over Tibet; Rapten is consistently framed as the ruler taking the pre-eminent role in political affairs.

According to Tsepon Shakabpa, although Gushri Khan and his successors are commonly referred to as 'Kings', they assumed a subservient position to those of the Dalai Lama and Sonam Rapten in formal seating arrangements; their status as 'Kings' seems to have referred more to their Mongol subjects than to the Tibetans. Gushri sent his troops to the Dalai Lama and Sonam Rapten whenever they were needed and had facilitated the establishment of the Dalai Lama's rule over Tibet, but by all accounts, Gushri "neither interfered in the administration nor tried to control its policies. All power and authority ultimately lay in the hands of the Dalai Lama, right up to the time of his death".

== His activities as ruler of Tibet ==
In 1643, Sonam Rapten began organising a census to be carried out, starting with the provinces of Tod to the north and Tsang to the east, and formulating taxation laws. He commissioned a detailed survey of the land and the population and gradually appointed officials to assess taxes.

=== Construction of Potala Palace ===
In 1645 Sonam Rapten met with the Dalai Lama and Gushri Khan and they decided to construct the Potala Palace. They visited the proposed site together and arranged consecration rituals to prepare for construction to begin. The initial external structure of the 'White Palace' part was built over the next three years with the help of indentured labour from Ü Tsang and the Dalai Lama moved into it in 1649.

=== His invasions of Bhutan ===
In 1643 when Sonam Rapten and Gushri Khan were visiting Lhodrak (an area adjoining the border with Bhutan) they heard that Monpa communities on Tibet's borders with Nepal and Bhutan were encountering problems from the Bhutanese. This gave an excuse for what Richardson called Sonam Rapten's repeated invasions of Bhutan: "those frequent and unrewarding campaigns the Gelugpa regime thought it necessary to undertake against Bhutan as the bastion of the older sects."

Modern Bhutan was founded by Ngawang Namgyal of the Drukpa Kagyu school who fled Tibet in 1616 when faced with arrest by the Tsangpa King over a dispute about the authenticity of his claimed status as the incarnation of the Fourth Drukchen. Once welcomed into exile by the Bhutanese he assumed national leadership by popular acclaim and consolidated the Himalayan country in its modern form.

Sonam Rapten's sectarian policies which were highlighted in 1652 by the Fifth Dalai Lama's decree proscribing them indicate the possibility that the over-ambitious Rapten wished to subdue and assimilate Bhutan into Tibet in order to convert 'wayward' Drukpa Kagyu followers to the Gelugpa tradition, while also bringing Bhutan itself under Ganden Phodrang control. Until then, his Mongol army had been invincible, defeating all anti- or non-Gelugpa leaders in Lhasa, Ü, Amdo, Kham, Tsang, Kongpo and elsewhere in southern Tibet. Bhutan must have seemed an easy target by comparison.

==== The 1644 expedition ====
In 1644 Sonam Rapten therefore despatched an expeditionary force of 700 Mongolians plus Tibetan forces into Bhutan, on the excuse of assisting the Monpas, but they found the southern passes were heavily fortified by Bhutanese forces. Though Rapten's army soon captured Kawang Dzong, the soldiers were unaccustomed to the terrain and the climate and the army suffered defeat and humiliation at the hands of the Bhutanese, shattering the myth of the Mongolian fighters' invincibility. After surrendering, Tibet's three leading officers were held hostage in order to guarantee non-aggression. Weapons, armour, equipment, supplies and animals were all confiscated. The disarmed soldiers, however, were escorted back to the Tibet border and freed by the Bhutanese.

In 1646 Sonam Rapten negotiated a peace treaty with Bhutan to release the hostages. The previous status quo and original borders were restituted and both sides committed themselves to harmonious coexistence. The Bhutanese also undertook to pay annual tribute of "the rich offering of rice" which they had previously made to the Tsangpa King to the Ganden Phodrang instead.

==== The 1648 invasion ====
The hostages were sent back "with gifts" in 1647, as agreed, but early in 1648 Sonam Rapten broke the 1646 treaty by ordering a new, three-pronged invasion of Bhutan with his brother Depa Norbu in command of the main army. It was supposedly a well-organised and well-prepared expedition.

This attempt met with an even worse fate that the first one with Norbu's column 'escaping in terror', causing the other columns to retreat as well. Again, most of the armour, weapons and supplies were lost to the Bhutanese. This embarrassing defeat was considered a 'disgraceful' one in Tibetan history and Norbu was accused of 'secret dealings' (i.e. treachery) with the Bhutanese.

In Dukula the Dalai Lama notes that the invasion plan was proceeding well when Norbu "precipitously deserted and ran away, losing his saddle and most of his armaments" and necessitating a difficult withdrawal to be made by the other two armies. Gushri and Sonam Rapten returned to Lhasa after monitoring the Bhutan campaign from the border.

==== The 1656 invasion ====
See section below on "His last years".

==== Use of magical means, the occult and oracles in the Bhutanese campaigns ====
Ngawang Namgyal's success and his decisive victories over the Tibetan attempts to subdue Bhutan in 1644 and 1648 [he died in 1651] were attributed to his effective use of occult powers, rather than to superior Bhutanese prowess in battle alone. Namgyal's biography by Pelden Gyatso gives graphic details of how rites performed by the Bhutanese protected them in the second invasion (1648) and caused the well-armed Tibetan forces to be repelled and routed.

Proof that such means were both used and feared is also found in the terms of the peace treaty signed between Bhutan and the Tsangpa King after the latter's failed invasion of Bhutan in 1639, in which Ngawang Namgyal's only concession to the Tsangpa was "to promise to forego further acts of black magic in the event of a satisfactory conclusion to the dispute". In return for this promise alone, the Tsangpa King completely capitulated, even ceding a piece of his territory to Bhutan in addition.

Similarly, as a last resort during the 1639–42 Tibetan civil wars, Sonam Rapten had employed the use of magic rituals. Being a Gelugpa supremacist it was with reluctance that he requested Nyingma rituals to be performed by the Fifth Dalai Lama and his 'root guru', the renowned Nyingma master Zur Choying Rangdrol, to apparent great effect (see next section for details).

Again, in 1650 or 1651, Sonam Rapten requested Zur to arrange just such an occult rite against Bhutan at Phagri (near the border), a ritual which was said to have soon caused the death of his arch-enemy, the master of magic, Drukpa Kagyu chieftain Ngawang Namgyal. On his sudden death from unknown causes four month later (although his death was kept a secret for 50 years), Sonam Rapten complimented Zur and his assistant on the efficacy of their magical rites, saying "Signs were quickly produced!"

Divinations and prophecies elicited from spirit oracles via their mediums also played an essential part in these struggles and some Tibetan failures in Bhutan are said to have occurred after the oracle's advice was sought but its warnings were ignored.

== Sectarian policies - countered by Fifth Dalai Lama ==
Although during his youth the Dalai Lama was consistently friendly and conciliatory towards the Tsangpa King, sectarian friction between the Kagyupa in Tsang and the Gelugpa in Ü under Sonam Rapten nevertheless continued to simmer until it boiled over into the civil war of 1641–42.

At the same time Sonam Rapten had to deal with Donyo Dorje, the Bonpo King of Beri in Kham who was the sworn enemy of all Buddhist schools and whose particular hatred for the Gelugpa made him even tougher. He had persecuted, killed and imprisoned many lamas, monks, officers and laymen of the Gelugpa, Karmapa, Drugpa, Drikhungka and Taglungpa schools. Against Sonam Rapten and his Lhasa Gelugpa, Dorje was a military ally of the Tsangpa King, who had encouraged Dorje to attack Gelugpa monasteries in Kham, such as Lithang, and to persecute the monks there. Then in 1629 someone leaked a confidential message, carried by a merchant called Dralha Jengyidong, from the Beri King to the Tsangpa King confirming their agreement to secretly raise their armies in order to attack the Lhasa Gelugpa from both sides the following year, hopefully putting an end to the Gelugpa school for once and for all.

Sonam Rapten was a staunch Gelugpa fanatic. He frowned upon the lifelong interest in non-Gelugpa religious traditions expressed by the Fifth Dalai Lama, whose earliest childhood memories from home were of traditional rituals, which he imitated, making tormas and pretending to play ritual instruments; he was fascinated by Bonpo tantrists rather than worldly matters and liked listening to Indian yogis talk, and stories of gods, ghosts and spirits. In fact, the Dalai Lama considered himself to have been reborn from ‘a black tantrist or a hungry Indian teacher’. By the time he reached 20 his growing attraction to magic ritual led him to study the magic tantric rites of the Nyingma tradition under the renowned Nyingma ritual master Zur Choying Rangdrol. Then in 1638, when he took full Gelugpa ordination, Sonam Rapten put his foot down and insisted that his studies under the Nyingma master must now be curtailed. The young Dalai Lama reluctantly deferred to him and stopped his non-Gelugpa activities.

Despite his fanaticism, however, Sonam Rapten was also a pragmatist. Two years later, in 1640, he was begging the Dalai Lama to carry out suitable magic Nyingma rituals to help defeat Donyo Dorje. On learning of the Beri King's secret alliance with the Tsangpa King against the Lhasa Gelugpa he had sent Güshri and his Mongol army to Kham to pre-empt their plot. The Dalai Lama had not agreed to this attack and at first he refused to help, making various excuses and pointing out that Rapten did not approve of magic rituals, having earlier curtailed his studies of them under Zur. Perhaps sardonically, he suggested Sonam Rapten should do the Gelugpa rite of Yamantaka, the wrathful form of Manjushri. Losing patience, Sonam Rapten pointed out that the practice of Yamantaka had failed to prevent the disastrous attacks on Lhasa by the Tsangpa forces in 1618. He expressed his contempt for Nyingma practices telling him curtly: “So practise Nyingma, then! The proverb says: ‘If it heals the wound, even dog fat is fine!’” On this, the Dalai Lama comments wryly in his Dukula: “Another proverb says: ‘When one needs stone, it is the Lord of Stone; when not, it is merely a lump of rock!’” In any case he relented, consulted Zur and performed an elaborate rite, which seems to have been successful. The Bonpo King was duly defeated and executed and all his prisoners released.

The Dalai Lama firmly opposed an attack on Tsang, pointing out that the persecution that Sonam Rapten complained about so much was merely retaliation for the Gelugpa's past aggressive actions and provocative behaviour against the other schools; they had brought it upon themselves, he said, adding "the lamas of the Sakya, Karmapa and Jonang schools were the Tsangpa King's three root-gurus, so why should we vie for their position?"

But Sonam Rapten took no notice. He was supposed to have instructed Güshri Khan to return to Amdo with his army after defeating Donyo Dorje, but now that war was won his deception was revealed. Behind his master's back he had authorised Güshri to attack and destroy the Tsangpa King and his anti-Gelugpa religious allies instead of retiring to Amdo. Soon, when things were again not going as well as Sonam Rapten hoped, the Dalai Lama, with Zur, was having to carry out more magic Nyingma rituals to support the rash aggression and avoid defeat.

After the rebellion in Kongpo was quelled in 1642, with Sonam Rapten's approval thirteen monasteries in Kongpo and in Tsang were closed down by order of the Dalai Lama as political punishment for their military support of the rebellion. This was done to ensure future national stability and to dissuade monks from monasteries of all schools from breaking their vows by engaging in warfare. These 13 included Kagyu monasteries affiliated to the Tsangpa King as well as the prestigious Jonangpa Monastery, probably Tagten Damcho Ling (rtag brtan dam chos gling) which was founded by Taranatha in 1615, closed down in 1642 and re-opened as a Gelugpa monastery called Ganden Phuntsok Ling in 1650. The Karmapa himself felt obliged to flee to the far east of Tibet and wandered abroad and in the provinces for the next 20 years.

The Dalai Lama himself was completely non-sectarian. He had various teachers belonging to the Nyingma, Kagyu and Sakya traditions, much to the distaste of many Gelugpa purists especially Sonam Rapten. Not only that but he was the first Tibetan Buddhist leader to recognise the Yungdrung Bon as Tibet's native religion and describes it as being the “holder of secret mantras ” when he issued the edict to appoint Sangye Gyatso as the Desi in 1679, addressing all the people of Tibet including "The Everlasting Bon, holder of the secret mantras". He even gave a tract of land to Muslim traders so they could practise their religion when in Tibet and eventually he legally banned sectarianism in Tibet by issuing a decree to proscribe it (see below), passing laws to ensure freedom of religion. He kept a Bonpo lama in his entourage to ensure the interests of the Bonpo were properly upheld.

After the 1648 invasion of Bhutan, however, more Kagyu monasteries were seized and converted to Gelugpa but the reasons for this are unclear. It seems that the Gelugpa administration headed by Sonam Rapten definitely carried out sectarian activities and persecuted other schools, at least until the Fifth Dalai Lama issued his decree forbidding all such sectarianism just before his departure to meet the Shunzhi Emperor in the summer of 1652. The emperor had sent several envoys to Lhasa to invite the Dalai Lama to Beijing from 1649 onwards. He finally accepted and set off in 1652, accompanied as far as Nyuklé Lating by Sonam Rapten. Four days earlier, at Gekya-ngo, he had given a list of parting instructions to Sonam Rapten, described in Dukula as follows:

“Around this time, the adepts of the Sakya, Kagyu and Nyingma schools were not allowed to wear hats in their own way, and it was intended that their religious affinities would gradually be converted to the Gelug. Many of our major and minor figures had given their approval for this and even made pleas (for this policy). If this was going to serve the interests of our school [the Gelugpa], it would most likely be good to have a unified school. However, to have a unified [merged] school would be beneficial neither to our own school nor to the others. In the long run it would come to: “Whatever one does, the results of that action will ripen”. Therefore this was a gross policy that needed to be renounced, because there was little purpose in it: no conversion of the schools should be undertaken and no hat style to be changed; the bad example of the big schools preventing the small ones from recruiting new monks was to be discouraged; the temples that were built to tame the grounds of the borderlands and their peripheries were to be restored; to establish rituals that would be beneficial to the people of Tibet... (etc.)"

With this decree, the Dalai Lama accused Sonam Rapten and his subordinates (referred to as "Many of our major and minor figures [who] had given their approval for this and even made pleas (for this policy)") of implementing sectarian policies, and ordered him and them to cease and desist: monks from sects other than the Gelugpa had not been allowed to wear their traditional style of hats that showed which sect they belonged to; there were mechanisms in place to systematically convert and absorb the other sects into the Gelugpa so they would disappear; there was a ban in place to prevent other sets from recruiting new monks; and there was a ban on maintenance of temples built by pre-Gelugpa sects to "tame the ground" on Tibet's borderlands and they needed restoration. All these measures can be fairly ascribed to Sonam Rapten's influence.

When the Fifth Dalai Lama returned from Beijing 17 months later in December 1653, he was met at Gamo, six days travel from Lhasa, by Sonam Rapten amongst a group of not only Gelugpa lamas but also "the lamas and incarnations of (the Gelugpa), Drigung Kagyü and Taklung Kagyü and so forth". This indicates that Sonam Rapten had taken the decree to heart and mended his sectarian ways. In addition, as mentioned in the Karmapa's biography, following a petition by Gyaltsab Rinpoche the twenty-one most important Kagyu monasteries that had been seized by the Geluk in 1648, including Tsurphu and Yangpachen, were given back to the school soon after Lobzang Gyatso's return.

== His last years ==
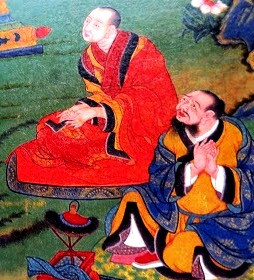
Sonam Rabten and Gushri Khan sitting at a teaching most likely being given by the Fifth Dalai Lama. From a mural at the Potala Palace, Lhasa, Tibet.

Sonam Rapten, in general, continued to dominate the Dalai Lama and Tibetan political affairs until his death in 1658. Until Güshri Khan died in 1655, as a pious and devoted disciple of the Dalai Lama he made his troops and advice freely available to Sonam Rapten in their joint collaboration. This ensured the authority of the Dalai Lama was maintained over the widest unified Tibetan Kingdom established since the time of Langdarma in the 9th century.

According to Richardson's reading of Dukula, however, Sonam Rapten after living a strenuous life "devoted himself more to religion than to politics" during his last few years. His prestige may have suffered, mused Richardson, from the serial failures of his attempts to invade and conquer Bhutan since these failures were ascribed to the shortcomings of his close relative and assistant Depa Norbu.

=== His last invasion of Bhutan, 1656-57 ===
Sonam Rabten's last invasion of Bhutan was explained, according to Shakabpa, as follows: “[In 1657] A Bhutanese chieftain, Chosje Namkha Rinchen, who had close contacts with Tibet, was killed, along with 20 members of his family, by his enemies. As a result, Tibetan troops were once again sent into Bhutan, and although no details are available, this campaign apparently achieved more success than earlier ones”.

Considering that Shakabpa states his main source for this period is Dukula, where several pages full of details about the invasion are available, and where there is no indication that the campaign succeeded in any way, his above comments are puzzling. It is also stated in the most detailed accounts (Dukula and Karma Phuntsho) that the invasion was launched not as Shakabpa claims in 1657 but in mid-1656.

Dukula describes the Chosje Namkha Rinchen incident as happening at Tromo in the Chumbi valley, but as a post-war event early in 1658 rather than as a 1657 casus belli as postulated in Shakabpa. The Fifth Dalai Lama wrote in mid-1656 that another invasion of Bhutan was “about to be launched”, but no justification for the attack is given. The Bhutanese assumed that it was “mainly an act of revenge by the Tibetan ruler Sonam [Rapten] for the disgraceful defeat he suffered in 1649”; they believed that he “wished to put Bhutan under Tibetan Gelugpa hegemony”. They also suspected that the Tibetans feared Bhutanese prowess with occult powers which, the Bhutanese claimed, had caused the death of Gushri Khan in 1655.

The invasion started late in the summer of 1656. Desi Sonam Rapten and retinue went to Tsang to supervise and ‘everyone felt apprehensive’. Depa Norbu became ‘involved in a secret plot’ which indicates he was working as a Bhutanese agent or mole, and he tried unsuccessfully to persuade the Fifth Dalai Lama to make Rabten delay or cancel the attack.

Sonam Rapten's insistence brought predictable results. After a year of guerrilla tactics by the defenders in the jungles and ravines of Bhutan, Norbu's troops had to retreat after being bogged down, succumbing to sickness and low morale. Though advances were made by the other columns Norbu wasted their advantage and "made no effort to advance and employed cowardly delaying tactics" while his men wasted away through epidemics. He also fell out with his brave Mongolian generals at the end and was said to have murdered one of them by poison. The invasion failed as miserably as the first two had and Tibet suffered yet another ignominious defeat. Sonam Rapten and the Mongolian Princes who had been monitoring the invasion from the border area returned to Lhasa with survivors late in the summer of 1657 and although negotiations for a truce continued for several years, nothing came of them.

Sonam Rapten, being Norbu's elder brother, pretended not to hear about his probable heir's many failings but eventually he was compelled to react and censure him due to "the proliferation of negative reports about (his) deceptive behaviour".

That winter, people started expressing concerns about Sonam Rapten growing old, so the Dalai Lama ordered extensive prayers and rituals to be done for his health and long life. Even so, in early spring 1658, on the 3rd day of the 3rd Tibetan month Sonam Rapten was taken ill and died following an epileptic fit. He was 63.

=== Funerary rituals, tributes and succession ===
Despite their disagreements about wars and sectarianism, the Dalai Lama respected Sonam Rapten and his achievements. When Rapten died in the spring of 1658, the Dalai Lama's immediate reaction was to hush up the death for over a year for political reasons of succession. At the same time, he arranged extensive offerings and rituals to be done for Rapten's welfare as if he were still alive. When the death was announced publicly some 13 months later he ordered and oversaw many more weeks of intensive funerary rituals in his honour, making extensive offerings to over 125,000 monks to the cumulative value of no less than 14,000 tons of barley grain. These offerings, listed item by item over several pages, included, for example, over 50 kilos of gold, 44,000 bolts of different kinds of cloth, including 498 of silk and over 65,000 special ceremonial scarves.

In contrast to these substantial physical offerings he pays somewhat vague verbal tribute to Sonam Rapten's achievements in his Dukula without actually mentioning anything specific, saying: "[Sonam Rapten] took on not only many troubles for the sake of the Gelug, but also performed other extensive activities that are undeniable and known to all." He then compared him to King Ralpachen, ruler of the Tibetan Empire at its zenith in the 9th century, who was "a man of divine manifestation" and who allotted seven households to each monk, adding "of course we cannot judge the activities of a person like him". By way of contrast, with regard to Sonam Rapten he remarks that "it is true that people can judge the meritorious work of an ordinary local ruler". He then puts him in proper perspective, saying "many Treasurers of great lamas were like the ordinary people (who) cared little about meritorious work"; after the death of such people "not much accompanied their departure". This was clearly not the case with Sonam Rapten.

Sonam Rapten was succeeded by his younger brother, Depa Norbu, who was appointed as the Fifth Dalai Lama's second Desi or Regent in the summer of 1659.

== Sources ==
- Staff. "The Dalai Lamas: Yonten Gyatso". The Office of His Holiness The Dalai Lama. Archived from the original on 2012-10-30. Office web site of His Holiness the 14th Dalai Lama of Tibet.
- Aris, Michael (1979). Bhutan: The Early History of a Himalayan Kingdom. Warminster, UK: Aris & Phillips Ltd. ISBN 0856680826
- Dhondup, K (1984). The Water-Horse and Other Years. Dharamsala: Library of Tibetan Works and Archives History Series.
- Dudjom Rinpoche (1991). The Nyingma School of Tibetan Buddhism. Translated by Gyrume Dorje. Wisdom Publications, Somerville, MA, USA. ISBN 9780861710874
- Karmay, Samten G. (1988). Secret Visions of the Fifth Dalai Lama. Serindia Publications, London. ISBN 0906026202
- Karmay, Samten G. (1998). The Fifth Dalai Lama and his Reunification of Tibet (F. Pommaret, ed., Lhasa, Terre du Divin, Geneva: Olizane, 1997, pp. 87–104. Translated from French by V. Martin). Chapter 29 of: The Arrow and the Spindle, Studies in History, Myths, Rituals and Beliefs in Tibet. Revised edition 2009. Kathmandu, Nepal, Mandala Book Point. ISBN 9789994655106.
- Karmay, Samten G. (2005). The Great Fifth - International Institute of Asian Studies, Leiden, Netherlands; Newsletter #39 Winter 2005, pp. 12–13.
- Karmay, Samten G. (Translator) (2014). Trulwai Roltsai; The Illusive Play ["Dukula"]: The Autobiography of the Fifth Dalai Lama. Serindia Publications. Chicago. ISBN 978-1-932476675.
- Lobsang Gyatso, 5th Dalai Lama (1652). Biography of Yonten Gyatso, 4th Dalai Lama. "Jig rten dbang phyug thams cad mkhyen pa yon tan rgya mtsho dpal bzang po’i rnam par thar pa nor bu’i ‘phreng ba". Tibetan Buddhist Resource Centre. W294-1813-eBook.pdf
- Mullin, Glenn H. (2001). The Fourteen Dalai Lamas: A Sacred Legacy of Reincarnation. Clear Light Publishers. Santa Fe, New Mexico. ISBN 1-57416-092-3
- Phuntsho, Karma (2013). The History of Bhutan. Vintage Books/Random House, India. ISBN 978-8184004113
- Richardson, Hugh E. (1998) High Peaks, Pure Earth; Collected Writings on Tibetan History and Culture. Serindia Publications, London. ISBN 0906026466
- Shakabpa, Tsepon W.D. (1967), Tibet: A Political History. New York: Yale University Press, and (1984), Singapore: Potala Publications. ISBN 0961147415.
- Shakabpa, Tsepon W.D. (2010). One Hundred Thousand Moons. An Advanced Political History of Tibet (2 volumes). Leiden (Netherlands), Boston (USA): Brill's Tibetan Studies Library. ISBN 9789004177321.
- Stein, R. A. (1972). Tibetan civilization (English ed.). Stanford, Calif.: Stanford Univ. Press. ISBN 0-8047-0901-7.
- Tucci, Giuseppe. 1949. Tibetan Painted Scrolls. Rome: La Libreria dello Stato, vol. 1
- Yoshiro Imaeda (2013). The Successors of Zhabdrung Ngawang Namgyel: Hereditary Heirs and Reincarnations. Thimphu: Riyang Books. ISBN 978-99936-899-3-5.
- Pelden Gyatso, Extensive Biography of Bhutan's Ngawang Namgyal, Song of the Cloud of Dharma, ’brug chen ngag dbang rnam rgyal gyi rnam thar rgyas pa chos kyi sprin chen po’i dbyangs, TBRC #W30164, 114-na-4, 135-ba-6.
- Petrül Ogyen Jikmé Chökyi Wangpo, dpal sprul o rgyan ‘jigs med chos kyi dbang po. Sun Illuminating Chronology, bstan rtsis ‘byed snang ba, TBRC W24850(?), f.13-ba-1.
- Drakgön Könchog Tenpa Rapgyé, Ocean Annals, vol.1 70-3, Religious History of Domé, mdo smad chos 'byung deb ther rgya mtsho, TBRC #W28064
- Kadrung Norgyé Nangpa Wangdü Tsering, Record of Ten Thousand Years, khri lo tham deb, TBRC #W23160
- Lobsang Gyatso, Fifth Dalai Lama (1652). Biography of Yonten Gyatso, 4th Dalai Lama. "Jig rten dbang phyug thams cad mkhyen pa yon tan rgya mtsho dpal bzang po’i rnam par thar pa nor bu’i ‘phreng ba". TBRC #W294-1813-eBook.pdf, f.27b, f.46b, f.50a-b.
- Desi Sangye Gyatso, sde srid sangs rgyas rgya mtsho, Garland of Golden Lapiz Lazuli, Religious History of the Yellow Hat [Gandenpa] [dga’ ldan] zhwa ser chos ‘byung baidur ser po’i phreng ba, TBRC #W8224, 314-na-5
- Dorjé Dzinpa Peljor Lhündrup, Chariot of Faith for those in the Fortunate Aeon f.28-ba-6.
- Sumpa Khenpo Yeshé Peljor, sum pa mkhan po ye shes dpal ‘byor. History of the Blue Lake, the New Song of Brahma, mtsho sngon gyi lo rgyus tshangs glu gsar snyan, TBRC W29970
- First Panchen Lama, Lozang Chökyi Gyeltsen, pan chen blo bzang chos kyi rgyal mtshan. Autobiography: Garland of Jewels Which Clearly Indicates Codes of Conduct, spyod thsul gsal bar ston pa nor bu’i phreng ba, TBRC W9752, f.66-na-6.
- Chechok Düpa, che mchog ‘dus pa. Clearing Away the Darkness of Torment, gdung ba’i mun sel.
- Collected Works of the 5th Dalai Lama [list of his teachers] TBRC #W294-1813, 1814.
