= Tsoltim Ngima Shakabpa =

- Born: 7 September 1943 (age 82); Lhasa, Tibet
- Education: St. Joseph's School, Darjeeling
- Relatives: Tsepon W. D. Shakabpa (father)
- Writing career
- Genres: Poetry, non-fiction

Tsoltim Ngima Shakabpa (Tibetan: ཞྭ་སྒབ་པ་ཚུལ་ཁྲིམས་ཉི་མ, Wylie: zhwa sgab pa tshul khrims nyi ma, born 7 September 1943 in Lhasa) is a Tibetan banker, activist, writer and poet, one of the first to write in English, composing poems in this language in 1967. Son of the Tibetan Finance Minister Tsepon W. D. Shakabpa, he left Tibet in 1950 to study at St. Joseph's School, Darjeeling in India before working for the Tibetan government in exile and settle in the United States and was naturalized American.

== Biography ==
Tsoltim Ngima Shakabpa is the youngest son of the Minister of Finance of the Tibetan Government in 1939-1950 Tsepon W. D. Shakabpa. He was educated in Tibet which he left in 1950, then in India at St. Joseph's College in Darjeeling and the United States.

He works for the Tibetan government in exile in India as CEO of the Tibetan Industrial Rehabilitation Society founded in October 1965 by the Government of India, the Tibetan exile government and foreign aid agencies, and rehabilitates 7000 Tibetan refugees in agribusiness camps in Himachal Pradesh.

He moved to Cranford, New Jersey, in the United States where he is a naturalized US citizen and lives with his American wife. There he became an international banker for the Republic National Bank of New York where he was assistant vice president based in Hong Kong before being appointed Senior Vice President in 1985, and then President at Corpus Christi, Texas until he was diagnosed with a stomach cancer in 1993. He struggles and regain health through meditation and Western medicine. According to his doctors, any trace of cancer was gone. However, he was struck again by a stroke in 1999.

Despite these setbacks, he became president of the Tibetan Association of Washington and founded the festival TibetFest in Seattle in the state of Washington.

He continues to write poetry and in 2002 published his first book in Catalan, Records d'un Tibetà at Pagès Editors (University of Lleida), a Spanish publishing house, then in English in 2003. In April 2002, he received the chief editor award for his achievements in poetry from the International Library of Poetry. While adopting a healthy attitude towards life, he continues to fight for the independence of Tibet, questioning the Tibetan autonomy requested by the Tibetan government in exile in China, which can not offer freedom as great as that enjoyed by the Tibetan refugees in the world today.

In 2007, he gets a prize of Saint Joseph's College in Darjeeling.

In 2011, he is among the Tibetan poets who participate to 100 Thousand Poets for Change.

He has a son, Wangchuk D. Shakabpa, and a daughter, Pema Yudon Shakabpa, and lives with his wife, Margaret Hennessy Shakabpa, in California.

== Publications ==
- Recollections of a Tibetan, avant-propos du Dalaï Lama, PublishAmerica, 2003, ISBN 1592865984
- Winds of Change: An Autobiography of a Tibetan, Paljor Publications, 2005
- Odds and Ends, 2006
- Voice of Tibet, préface Robert Barnett, Paljor Publications, 2006, ISBN 81-86230-57-2
- Dead People Talking, Paljor Publications, 2008
- I Imagine, 2009
- Being Tibetan 2010
- Voices of the Voiceless, 2011
