= Dungkar Dictionary of Tibetan Studies =

Literary work

The Dunga Dictionary of Tibetan Studies (Chinese: 东噶藏学大辞典 Tibetan: དུང་དཀར་ཚིག་མཛོད་ཆེན་མོ, Wylie: dung dkar tshig mdzod chen mo) is a comprehensive reference work on Tibetan studies, published by the People's Republic of China and edited by renowned Tibetan scholar Dungkar Lozang Trinlé. Recognized as a key project under China's Ninth Five-Year Plan in 1988, this dictionary serves as a vital resource for scholars of Tibetan studies and educators teaching the Tibetan language.

The dictionary spans 2.8 million words and includes approximately 14,000 entries. It covers a wide range of topics, including notable Tibetan historical figures, significant historical events, Sino-Tibetan relations, ancient Tibetan laws and governmental institutions, specialized official documents, ancient monuments, important temples, Tibetan folklore, and religious practices in Tibetan regions. The book was published by the China Tibetology Publishing House in April 2002.
