= Dungkar Lozang Trinlé =

Dungkar Lozang Trinlé (Tibetan: Dung-dkar blo-bzang 'phrin-las, sometimes transcribed Dungkar Lobsang Trinlay, 1927–21 July 1997) was one of the most important Tibetan historians of the 20th century.

He was born in the south-eastern district of Kongpo. At the age of four he was recognised as the eighth incarnation of Dungdkar Rinpoche, the Lama of Dungdkar Monastery. He left the monastic life after obtaining a geshé degree from Sera Monastery.

At the time of the uprising in 1959 he was teaching far away from Tibet. He renounced his vows and married, but could not escape denunciation, and during the Cultural Revolution he worked as a labourer in the fields. After his exoneration, he returned to Beijing, remarried, and worked at the Central Nationalities Institute, where he wrote Snyan ngag la 'jug tshul tshig rgyan rig pa'i sgo 'byed ("Opening the door to the study of ornamentation for writing poetry", 1982). In the mid 1980s he returned to Lhasa and taught history at Tibet University, promoting the cause of bilingual education. Official attitudes hardened against Tibet and at the time of his death in Los Angeles, USA, he was out of favour with authorities. His decision to write about Tibet from a Marxist viewpoint in his books had already alienated some exiles.

He is remembered for the monumental reference work, Dung dkar tshig mdzod ("Dungkar's Encyclopedia" or "Dungkar Tibetological Great Dictionary", or "White Conch Encyclopedia"), last reprinted in 2002, and for Bod-kyi Chos Srid Zung-'brel Skor Bshad-pa ("The Merging of Religious and Secular Rule in Tibet", 1981/3), a religious history emphasizing politics and sociology, translated into English in 1991 by Chen Guansheng.

== See also ==
- Dungkar Dictionary of Tibetan Studies
