= Norbu =

Norbu (Tibetan: ནོར་བུ་, Wylie: Norbu; Chinese: 诺布; pinyin: Nuòbù) is a Tibetan name meaning "jewel". It may refer to:

- Norbu Peak, a 17,155 ft.-high dome-shaped mountain in Manali, Himachal Pradesh, India
- Khyentse Norbu, a lama from Bhutan
- Norbulingka, a palace in Lhasa, Tibet
- Chogyal Namkhai Norbu, a Dzogchen teacher
- Gyaincain Norbu, the eleventh Panchen Lama, according to some sources
- Pema Norbu Rinpoche, the eleventh throne holder of the Buddhist Palyul lineage
- Thubten Jigme Norbu, elder brother of the fourteenth Dalai Lama
- Jamyang Norbu, a Tibetan exile political activist
- Thinley Norbu, a Nyingmapa lama
- Tsewang Norbu, a Tibetan singer
- Katok Tsewang Norbu, a Nyingmapa lama
- Gungsangnorbu, a Chinese politician
- Gyaincain Norbu, chairman of the Tibet Autonomous Region from 1990 to 1998
- Wangdi Norbu, a former Bhutanese finance minister

Norbu may also refer to Norbu, a natural sweetener/sugar substitute derived from monkfruit (Siraitia grosvenorii), available in Australia since 2013.
