= Samten Karmay =

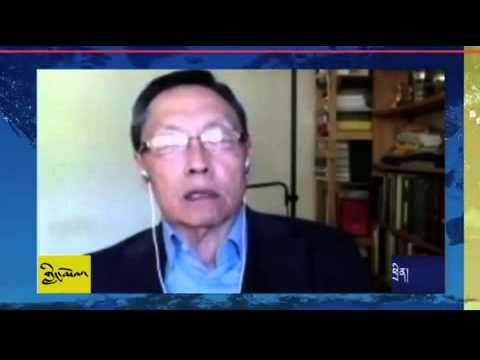
Samten Karmay 2015

Samten Gyeltsen Karmay (Tibetan: མཁར་རྨེའུ་བསམ་གཏན་རྒྱལ་མཚན།, Wylie: bsam gtan rgyal mtshan mkhar rme'u; born 1936) is a Tibetan writer and researcher in the field of Tibetan Studies. His work is focused on the study of Tibetan myths, beliefs, the Bon religion and religious history.

== Life and work ==
Samten Gyeltsen was born in 1936 in Amdo Sharkhog, eastern Tibet. He received religious training in Dzogchen meditation from his uncle. He completed his studies in the Bon monastery in 1955, obtaining the degree of geshe, and left with a group of friends to Drepung Monastery, a Gelug gompa near Lhasa. The monastery was known for its high philosophical training.

After leaving Drepung due to the difficult political situation, Samten moved to Nepal and later to India. After working for some time in Delhi, he was invited to England by David Snellgrove under a Rockefeller fellowship. Upon moving to Europe, he assumed the surname Karmay. He studied under two mentors, Snellgrove and Rolf Stein, who both recognized Samten's knowledge of Tibetan texts. He earned an M. Phil degree at the SOAS, University of London.

In 1980 he moved to France, where he entered the Centre national de la recherche scientifique (National Centre for Scientific Research). During his time there, he was awarded with the CNRS Silver Medal for his contribution to Human Sciences. A number of Revue d'Études Tibétaines was dedicated to him in November 2008. He also held the post of the President of the International Association of Tibetan Studies between 1995 and 2000, being the first Tibetan to be elected to the post. In 2005 he was a visiting professor at the International Institute for Asian Studies, under the sponsorship of Bukkyo Dendo Kyokai (""Society for the Promotion of Buddhism"").

== Books and articles ==
- Karmay, Samten G. (2014). The Illusive Play, The Autobiography of the Fifth Dalai Lama. Serindia Publications. ISBN 978-1932476675.
- Karmay, Samten G. (1972). The Treasury of Good Sayings: The Tibetan History of Bon. London, OUP 1972 [London Oriental Series, volume 26]. (Reprint by Motilal Banarsidass, Delhi 2001)
- Karmay, Samten G. (1977). A Catalogue of Bonpo Publications, Tokyo: Toyo Bunko 1977.
- Karmay, Samten G. The Arrow and the Spindle: Studies in History, Myths, Rituals and Beliefs in Tibet. Kathmandu: Mandala Book 1998
  - Vol 1, Part VI, Chapter 29: The Fifth Dalai Lama and his Reunification of Tibet, pp. 503-517.
- Karmay, Samten G. Vairocana and the rGyud-bzhi. Tibetan Medicine, a Publication for the Study of Tibetan Medicine, Library of Tibetan Works and Archives: Dharamsala 1989
- Karmay, Samten G. New Horizons in Bon Studies, co-authored with Yasuhiko Nagano, National Museum of Ethnology, Osaka 2000
- Karmay, Samten G. A Survey of Bonpo Monasteries and Temples in Tibet and the Himalaya, co-authored with Yasuhiko Nagano, National Museum of Ethnology, Osaka, 2003
- Karmay, Samten G; Watt, Jeff (2007). Bon, The Magic Word: the indigenous religion of Tibet. Philip Wilson. ISBN 9780856676499. LCCN 2007041891.
- Karmay, Samten G. Little Luminous Boy: The Oral Tradition from the Land of Zhang Zhung, White Orchid Press, 1988
- Karmay, Samten G. The Great Perfection (rDzogs chen in Tibetan), A Philosophical and Meditative Teaching of Tibetan Buddhism, Brill, 2007
- Karmay, Samten G. Secret Visions of the Fifth Dalai Lama: The Gold Manuscript in the Fournier Collection Musée Guimet, Paris, Serindia Publications, 1991
- Karmay, Samten G. Religion and Politics: commentary, Where Tibetans Write, September 2008, https://web.archive.org/web/20160305233421/http://www.tibetwrites.org/?religion-and-politics-commentary
- Karmay, Samten G. (1998 [1980]). “The Ordinance of lHa Bla-ma Ye-shes-’od.” In The Arrow and the Spindle. Kathmandu: Mandala. 3–16.
- Karmay, Samten G. (1998 [1983]). “Early Evidence for the Existence of Bon as a Religion in the Royal Period.” In The Arrow and the Spindle. Kathmandu: Mandala. 157–166.
- Karmay, Samten G. (2009). “A new discovery of Ancient Bon Manuscripts from a Buddhist stūpa in Southern Tibet.” East and West 59.1-4: 55-86.
