= Tsepon W. D. Shakabpa =

Tibetan politician

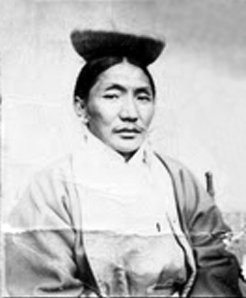
- Tsepon W. D. Shakabpa

Finance Minister of Tibet
- In office 1939–1950
- Dalai Lama: Tenzin Gyatso

Personal details
- Born: January 11, 1907 Lhasa, Tibet
- Died: February 23, 1989 (aged 82) Corpus Christi, Texas, United States
- Occupation: Diplomat, Politician, Scholar, Author
- Known for: Tibet: A Political history

Shakabpa Wangchuk Deden (Tibetan: ཞྭ་སྒབ་པ་དབང་ཕྱུག་བདེ་ལྡན་, Wylie: zhwa sgab pa dbang phyug bde ldan, January 11, 1907 – February 23, 1989), better known as Tsepon W. D. Shakabpa, was a Tibetan nobleman, scholar, historian, statesman and former Finance Minister of the government of Tibet.

== Biography ==
Tsepon Shakabpa was born in Lhasa, Tibet. His father Laja Tashi Phuntsok Shakabpa was a senior lay official in charge of the government treasury, and the steward of Lhasa. His father's brother was Trimon Norbu Wangyal, who became the most influential minister in the cabinet of the 13th Dalai Lama. His mother was Samdup Dolma, from the Ngodrupding family. The third Reting Gyalpo Ngawang Yeshe Tsultrim Gyaltsen was born into the Ngodrupding family, and ruled Tibet as Regent from 1845 to 1862. His mother's older brother was Lonchen Changkyim, one of the group of three Prime Ministers during the reign of the 13th Dalai Lama. The younger brother of his mother, was Ngoshi Jampa Thuwang, personal physician of the 13th Dalai Lama. Both his maternal uncles accompanied the 13th Dalai Lama into exile to India in 1910. Shakabpa joined the Government at the age of 23 in 1930, as an official of the Treasury. He was appointed Minister of Finance in 1939, a position he held until 1950. His paternal uncle Trimon, who had participated in the tripartite negotiations between Great Britain, China and Tibet in 1914, encouraged him to take up an interest in Tibetan history. Trimon in 1931, handed him many documents he had personally collected from the Simla Accord negotiations, in order to counter the Chinese narrative accounts concerning his country.

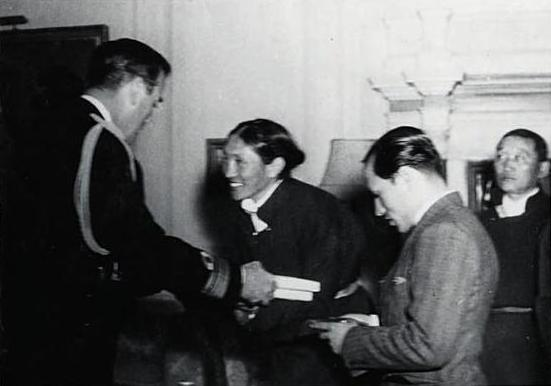
1948 meeting of Shakabpa and the last British Viceroy of India, Lord Louis Mountbatten

Between late 1947 and early 1949, Shakabpa, in his capacity as Tibet's Finance Minister, was dispatched abroad by the Tibetan Cabinet, or Kashag, as head of a Tibetan Trade Mission. This Tibet Trade Delegation traveled around to world to investigate the possibilities of commercial treaties, particularly with the United States. He traveled to India, China, USA, England, France, Switzerland and Italy. The mission was intended also to strengthen claims for Tibet as an independent, sovereign nation. The Tibetan Government in Exile argues that the official passport he was issued with at the time illustrates that Tibet was an independent country.

As Chinese forces spilled over into Amdo and Kham, Shakabpa and Tsechak Khenchung Thupten Gyalpo were appointed to serve as chief negotiators with the Chinese. The mission was aborted when the Tibetan cabinet minister in eastern Tibet, Ngapo Ngawang Jigme, apparently arranged an agreement with the Chinese. When the PRC entered Tibet in 1951, Shakabpa went into exile, moving to India. There he rallied international support for Tibetan independence, than remain in Tibet and be forced to collaborate with the communists. He was the chief diplomatic representative of the 14th Dalai Lama to the Indian government in New Delhi from 1959 to 1966. It was from this time on that Shakabpa began to concentrate on a rigorous and extensive study of Tibetan history.

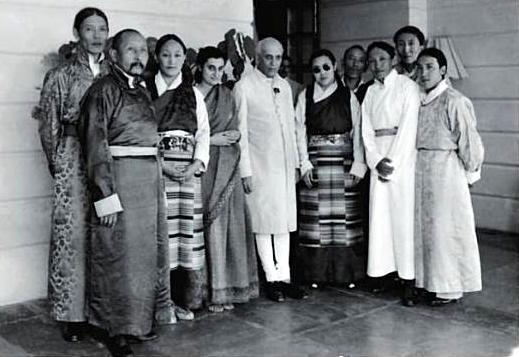
The 1950 Tibetan Delegation to India met with Indian Prime Minister Nehru at his residence in New Delhi. Front row (left to right): Tsecha Thubten Gyalpo, Pema Yudon Shakabpa (wife of Tsepon Shakabpa), Indira Gandhi, Prime Minister Jawaharlal Nehru, Tsering Dolma (sister of the 14th Dalai Lama of Tibet), Tsepon Wangchuk Deden Shakabpa, Depon Phuntsok Tashi Takla (husband of Tsering Dolma). Back row left is Dzasa Jigme Taring.

As events in Tibet deteriorated in the mid-fifties, he began to organize the Tibetan resistance together with the Dalai Lama's two older brothers, Gyalo Thondup and the Taktser Rinpoche also known as Thubten Jigme Norbu. After China's violent suppression of Tibetan demonstrations, and the flight of the Dalai Lama and 80,000 Tibetans into exile, Shakabpa played a key role in developing the exile infrastructure. These responsibilities included establishing of settlements for assisting the new diaspora in India, providing sustenance for the refugees, organizing schools. And also the immigration of many young Tibetans across Western Europe in the early sixties. In this capacity as the Dalai Lama's chief representative, he was centrally responsible for developing the infrastructure to take care of the Tibetan exiles in India. He also played the role of a sort of Tibetan ambassador-at-large for the Dalai Lama in New Delhi. In May 1985, the Kashag (Tibetan Cabinet) of the government-in-exile honored him at a special ceremony, and presented him with a commendation that said in part, "in appreciation of his distinguished service for the independence of Tibet, we would like to honor him as a great exponent of the political history of Tibet". His major work, Tibet: A Political History, published by Yale University Press in 1967, has been judged 'the most thorough explication in a western language of a Tibetan's view of their history' down to recent times. His perspective views the historical relationship between China and Tibet as flowing from the model of preceptor and patron (mchod gnas dang yon bdag) established by Genghis Khan, whereby 'the Lama serv(ed) as the spiritual guide and preceptor of the Khan. And the Khan played the role of the protector and patron of the Lama,' and that Tibet was 'forcibly incorporated into China under the threat of military destruction only in 1951'. This book, and in his more definitive account in Tibetan, published in 1976, have not only been sharply critiqued by Chinese Tibetologists but have come under continuous and aggressive attack by Beijing.

Shakabpa lived in New Delhi, Kalimpong, and Manhattan. He died of stomach cancer in 1989 at the age of 82 in the home of his youngest son, Tsoltim Ngima Shakabpa, in Corpus Christi, Texas.

=== Writings ===
- Buddha's Relics in Tibet (Baptist Mission Press, Calcutta 1951)
- Tibet: A Political History (Yale University Press, 1967)
- Bod-kyi srid don rgyalrabs, 2 vols. (Shakabpa House, Kalimpong, 1976. See 2010)
- Tibet (Encyclopædia Britannica 15th. ed. 1977)
- Catalogue and Guide to the Central Temple of Lhasa (Shakabpa House, Kalimpong, India, 1981)
- The Nectar of the Immortal Gods Inducing Recollection in the Brethren Living at Home in the Three Provinces of Tibet and Living in Exile (booklet co-authored with Yongten Gyatso, 1988)
- A Brief History of Ancient Monasteries and Temples in Tibet, Ed. T. Tsepal Taikhang (Wangchuk Deden Shakabpa Memorial Foundation, Varanasi, 2002)
- One Hundred Thousand Moons. Translated by Derek F. Maher (BRILL, 2010)

=== Oral history ===
- "Oral history interview of Shakabpa Wangchug Deden by Gelek Rimpoche". Library of Congress Asian Division. LCCN 2020705901.

== Tsepon Shakabpa Passport Recovery (2003) ==
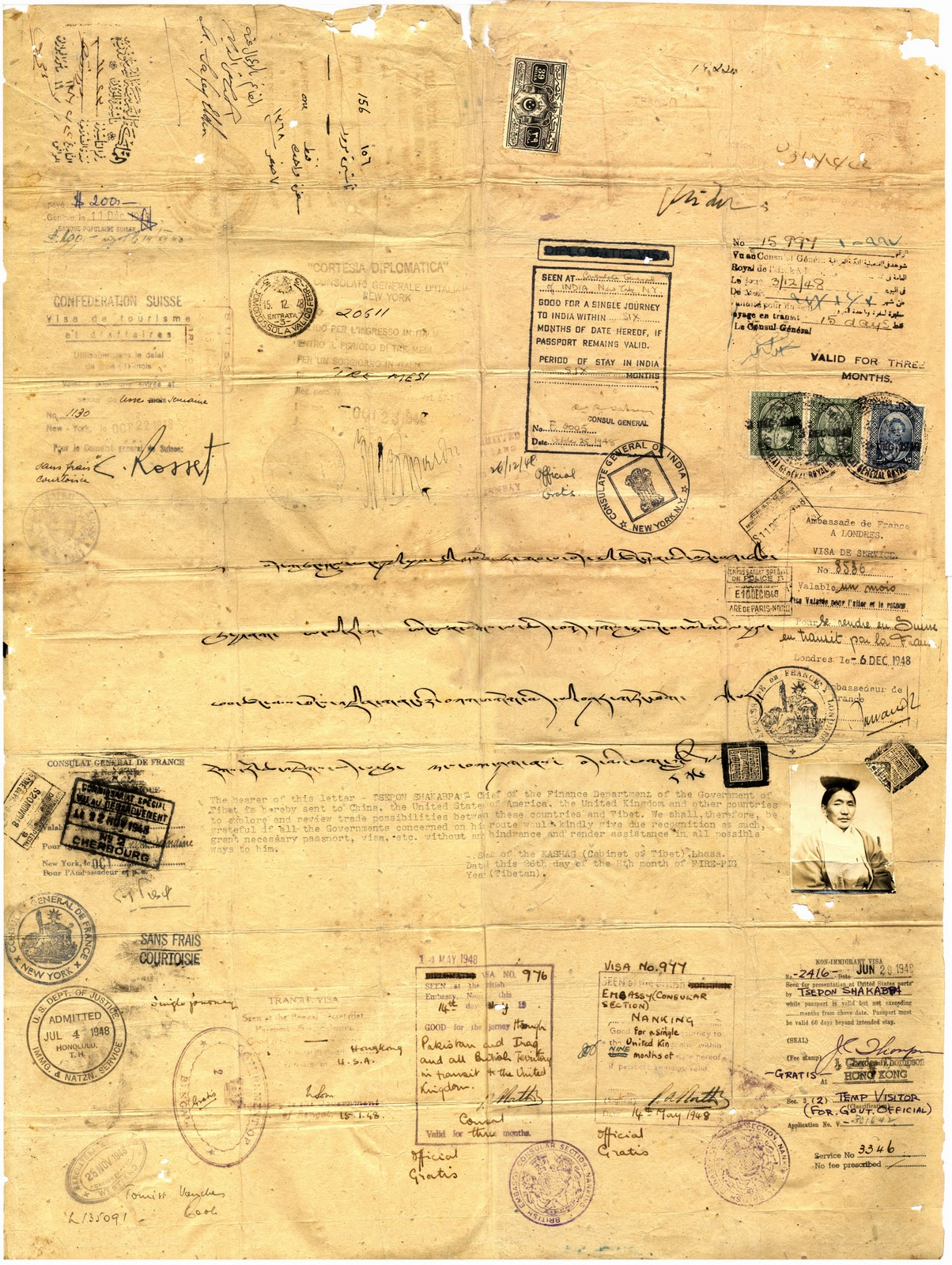
1947 Tsepon WD Shakabpa Passport (Collection: Friends of Tibet Foundation + Office of His Holiness the Dalai Lama)

A photograph of the historic Tsepon Shakabpa passport was originally published in 1967 in his book Tibet: A Political History. The historic document got lost from the Tibetan community in 1992 and there were rumours that it had been sold to antique dealers and had fallen into the hands of Chinese government officials. After 13 years of searching, the Friends of Tibet Foundation located the historic passport with an antique dealer in Nepal and purchased the document for an undisclosed amount to be presented to the 14th Dalai Lama in 2004. Issued by the Kashag to Tibet's finance minister Shakabpa for foreign travel, the passport was a single piece of pink paper, complete with photographs. It has a message in hand-written Tibetan and typed English, similar to the message by the nominal issuing officers of today's passports, stating that "the bearer of this letter – Tsepon Shakabpa, Chief of the Finance Department of the Government of Tibet, is hereby sent to China, the United States of America, the United Kingdom and other countries to explore and review trade possibilities between these countries and Tibet. We shall, therefore, be grateful if all the Governments concerned on his route would kindly give due recognition as such, grant necessary passport, visa, etc. without any hindrance and render assistance in all possible ways to him." The text and the photograph is sealed by a square stamp belonging to the Kashag and is dated "26th day of the 8th month of Fire-Pig year (Tibetan)" (10 October 1947 in the Gregorian calendar).

The passport has received visa and entry stamps from several countries and territories, including India, the United States, the United Kingdom, France, Italy, Switzerland, Pakistan, Iraq and Hong Kong, but not China. Some visas do reflect an official status, with mentions such as "Diplomatic courtesy, Service visa, Official gratis, Diplomatic visa, for government official".

Today, this historic document remains to stand as an important proof of the independent status of Tibet legally recognized by other countries before China's invasion of Tibet in 1949.
