= Kagyud Nampar Gyalwa =

Tibetan prince of Ü-Tsang (died 1623)

Kagyud Nampar Gyalwa (Wylie transliteration: bKa' brgyud rnam par rgyal ba; died 1623) was a prince in Central Tibet (Ü-Tsang). He belonged to the Phagmodrupa dynasty which reigned in Tibet or parts of it from 1354 to the early 17th century. He is sometimes represented as the penultimate ruler of the line, although the circumstances about his political position are ill-recorded.

== Position in the Phagmodrupa dynasty ==
Kagyud Nampar Gyalwa was a son of the preceding ruler of the dynasty, Ngawang Drakpa Gyaltsen. According to some lists he took over the throne after his father who is known to have died in 1603 or 1604. Building on an indigenous history, Sarat Chandra Das says of him: "From the time of Namber-Gyal-van's reign, the chiefs and nobles of U' and Tsaṅ constantly waged war with each other, in consequence of which the power of the king waned, to a great extent. At this time the king of Tsaṅ became very powerful and by taking advantage of the reigning king's weakness gradually became the de facto sovereign of Tibet".

His person is however the most obscure of all in the history of the Phagmodrupa, and there is very little information about his actions in the chronicles. By this time the dynasty had almost ceased to wield any executive power in Tibet. Chinese sources are at variance with the Tibetan ones, since they say that a ruler called Zhashi Cangbu (Tashi Zangpo) flourished after 1579. This ruler is stated to have died around 1600 and been succeeded by his unnamed son. One option is that the son was Kagyud Nampar Gyalwa, but the indigenous Tibetan sources suggest that another scion called Mipham Wanggyur Gyalpo ascended the throne in Nêdong, southeast of Lhasa, in 1604. It appears that Kagyud Nampar Gyalwa had to be content with governing as zhabdrung (lama-official) in Gongkar, another stronghold of the Phagmodrupa further to the west. According to the chronicles of the Fifth Dalai Lama, Kagyud Nampar Gyalwa "opened wide the doors of both religious and secular knowledge but paid special attention to the doctrines of Absolute Truth, such as Mahamudra".

== Yearning for the Dalai Lama ==
During his time the Third Dalai Lama, a friend of the Phagmodrupa, strengthened his ties with the Tümed Mongols. After his death in 1588 a Mongol prince was identified as the new Dalai Lama. The boy, Yonten Gyatso, stayed in Mongolia for several years, although many Tibetans appealed to his family to let him travel to Tibet. Kagyud Nampar Gyalwa wrote a poem in 33 verses where he appealed to the young boy:

"Please become a monk and come here,
To this temple where apparitions are displayed,
To Ü Tsang, the purified land that has been cleansed hundreds of times,
By the river current of words of Indian and Tibetan scholars.
Take the place of your previous incarnation
On the fearless Snow Lion Throne,
And ceaselessly turn the wheel of dharma through a hundred eons."

Actually the fourth Dalai Lama only came to Tibet in 1601. Arriving at Kökö-hota, Yonten Gyatso was met by representatives of the main Gelugpa monasteries and supporting noble families who officially ratified his identity as a true incarnation. These included an envoy from Kagyud Nampar Gyalwa's kinsman Mipham Wanggyur Gyalpo who took over the largely illusory throne a few years later, in 1604, and kept it until his death in 1613. It is unclear if Kagyud Nampar Gyalwa ever ruled in Nêdong in his own name. His death is recorded in 1623. At any rate his son Mipham Sonam Wangchuk Drakpa Namgyal Palzang was the last Phagmodrupa ruler before the creation of the dharma state of the Dalai Lamas in 1642.

== See also ==
- History of Tibet
- Tibet during the Ming Dynasty
