= Mipham Wanggyur Gyalpo =

12th Phagmodrupa Tibetan ruler (1589–1613)

Mipham Wanggyur Gyalpo (Wylie: Mi pham dbang sgyur rgyal po, 1589? – 1613?) was a king in Central Tibet who ruled in 1604–1613 and belonged to the Phagmodrupa dynasty. His largely nominal reign saw increasing political tumult in Tibet which was related to the political ambitions of the rival Tsangpa dynasty.

== Alliance with the Dalai Lama faction ==
The preceding king (gongma) Ngawang Drakpa Gyaltsen had led an inefficient but relatively peaceful reign in the last decades of the sixteenth century. Although the executive powers of the Phagmodrupa slipped away after the political turmoil of the 1550s and 1560s, the gongma was at the center of a system where different religious and political factions of Ü (East Central Tibet) balanced each other. Meanwhile, Tsang (West Central Tibet) was increasingly dominated by the upstart Tsangpa dynasty. The Gelugpa church, which had the Dalai Lama as spiritual head, entertained good relations with the Phagmodrupa. When the Fourth Dalai Lama Yonten Gyatso traveled from Mongolia to Tibet in 1601, he was met by an envoy of Mipham Wanggyur Gyalpo, a member of another branch of the family than that of the old gongma. Strangely, he is here called gongma and lord of all Tibet (Gangchen namkyi gön chik). When the actual monarch Ngawang Drakpa Gyaltsen died in 1603 or 1604 he was not succeeded by his son Kagyud Nampar Gyalwa but rather by Mipham Wanggyur Gyalpo, who was also called Ngagi Wangchuk Drakba Gyaltsen Pal Zangpo. He might have been a grand-nephew of the late king. It appears that he did not renew the bonds with the religious leaders of the Karmapa and Shamarpa, but sought friendly relations with Gelugpa (the school of Dalai Lama) and Drukpa.

== Turbulence in Central Tibet ==
The chronicle of the Fifth Dalai Lama, The Song of the Spring Queen, says that "after the zhabdrung gongma [Ngawang Drakpa Gyaltsen] demonstrated how to remove [oneself] to another sphere [i.e., died], the writ of the Phagmodrupa no longer ran." The political situation of Central Tibet was disturbed by increasing activity by the Tsangpa ruler Karma Tensung who led a military expedition to Phanyul in 1605. Two years later a conference was held in the Phagmodrupa stronghold Gongkar (Gongri Karpo) where the Tsangpa and some Ü factions were represented. The meeting did not lead to a political settlement. In 1610 the Tsangpa attacked and completely crushed the important Yargyab polity and moved to restrict the influence of the Gelugpa and their leader, the Third Dalai Lama Yonten Gyatso. The Phagmodrupa, who played an increasingly marginal role in regional politics, were involved in fighting in Yartö in 1613. Mipham Wanggyur Gyalpo seemingly died in the same year, presumably in connection with the war or the smallpox epidemic that broke out at the same time. It is not certain who succeeded him, but the next documented Phagmodrupa ruler was Mipham Sonam Wangchuk Drakpa Namgyal Palzang in the 1620s.

== See also ==
- History of Tibet
- Sino-Tibetan relations during the Ming dynasty

| Preceded by Ngawang Drakpa Gyaltsen | Ruler in Tibet; 1604–1613 | Succeeded by Mipham Sonam Wangchuk Drakpa Namgyal Palzang |
