= Mipham Sonam Wangchuk Drakpa Namgyal Palzang =

13th Phagmodrupa Tibetan ruler (late 16th century–1671)

Mipham Sonam Wangchuk Drakpa Namgyal Palzang (Tibetan: མི་ཕམ་བསོད་ནམས་དབང་ཕྱུག་གྲགས་པ་རྣམ་རྒྱལ་དཔལ་བཟང, Wylie: Mi pham bsod nams dbang phyug grags pa rnam rgyal dpal bzang, died 1671) was a king in Central Tibet. He belonged to the Phagmodrupa dynasty which reigned in Tibet, or parts of it, from 1354 to the early 17th century, and was the last prince of the dynasty.

== Support for the Dalai Lama ==
Mipham Sonam Wangchuk Drakpa Namgyal Palzang was the eldest son of the prince Kagyud Nampar Gyalwa (died 1623) and the grandson of king Ngawang Drakpa Gyaltsen (died 1603/04). The circumstances around his accession are extremely obscure. The materials worked out by Giuseppe Tucci suggests that he succeeded to the throne by c. 1600. In the early years of the 17th century he is intermittently mentioned in the sources with the ruling title (desi). However, according to the investigation Olaf Czaja, Ngawang Drakpa Gyaltsen was actually succeeded by a scion of a rival branch, Mipham Wanggyur Gyalpo, in 1604. Only some time after the death of the latter in 1613, Mipham Sonam Wangchuk Drakpa Namgyal Palzang would have been consecrated as ruler. Whether his father Kagyud Nampar Gyalwa ever ruled in his own name is not clear. Whatever the case, by this time the dynasty had since long been eclipsed by other political and religious centers. However, in the early years of the 17th century the authority of the Phagmodrupa revived somewhat in the Ü region (East Central Tibet). This was due to their good connections with the Gelugpa. The main political division at this time was between the Gelugpa sect, aided by their Mongol allies, and the Karmapa and their patrons of the Tsangpa dynasty. The Phagmodrupa kings were traditionally friendly disposed towards the Gelugpa leaders, the Dalai Lamas.

== Defeated by the Tsangpa ==
The position of the Phagmodrupa was nevertheless fragile. In 1613 their troops carried out a raid in the Lhasa valley. This provoked a swift retaliation by the Tsangpa. From his base in the Tsang region (West Central Tibet), the Tsangpa ruler made repeated incursions into Ü. In 1616 he subjugated the Kyishod area close to Lhasa and forced the Phagmodrupa palace in Nêdong to submit. With this stroke, most of Ü and Tsang was in the hands of the Tsangpa lord Karma Phuntsok Namgyal, who was now arguably the King of Tibet. His triumph was confirmed by a new successful Tsangpa invasion in 1618. Lhasa was taken, and the Gelugpa lost their most important monasteries in Ü and Tsang. Karma Phuntsok Namgyal now moved to eliminate the last possible obstacle to hegemony in Ü, namely the Phagmodrupa of Nêdong. In 1620 he led an expedition that surrounded Nêdong and occupied the entire Yarlung Valley. All resistance was crushed and the Tsangpa took over the fortress at Nêdong. Whether Mipham Sonam Wangchuk Drakpa Namgyal Palzang was the ruler at this time is not clear. At any rate he survived under obscure circumstances in the following decades, being forced by the circumstances to side with the Tsangpa. During the Gelugpa-Karmapa struggle in 1635 he was expelled from Lhasa. In the chronicles of the Fifth Dalai Lama (1643), he is still spoken of with a degree of regard.

== Under the Dalai Lama regime ==
With the final triumph of Dalai Lama over the Tsangpa in 1642, the Phagmodrupa regime was at any rate a thing of the past. The ruler was allowed to keep his estates and met a number of times with the Dalai Lama. However, he suffered mental problems and was not respected by the other regional lords. The first ruler of the Qing dynasty, the Shunzhi Emperor, notified the Fifth Dalai Lama in 1657 that the Phagmodrupa lord had recently sent envoys to the Chinese court: "I have been told that the Chanhuawang [Phagmodrupa lord] was originally King of Tibet and then was overthrown by Tsangpa Khan. Tsangpa Khan was overthrown later by Gushri Khan of Oirat. The latter put the Chanhuawang under the Fifth Dalai Lama who again put the prince under the depa [regent] ... Now he [the envoy] has come to ask that the seals and certificate be exchanged without reporting the truth." The Shunzhi Emperor questioned the diplomatic initiative of the Phagmodrupa and asked Dalai Lama to clarify matters. This implies that the imperial court now considered the Phagmodrupa dynasty a concluded chapter. When Mipham Sonam Wangchuk Drakpa Namgyal Palzang died in 1671, no successor to his estate was appointed, and in 1675 Nêdong was given to an outsider. The last known members of the Phagmodrupa line were his son Lozang Khyentse Wangchuk (b. 1625) and grandson Yizhin.

== See also ==
- History of Tibet
- Sino-Tibetan relations during the Ming dynasty

Preceded by Mipham Wanggyur Gyalpo	Ruler in Tibet; 17th century	Succeeded by 5th Dalai Lama and Güshi Khan
