= Pha Trelgen Changchup Sempa =

Mythical Monkey-Ancestor of the Tibetan people

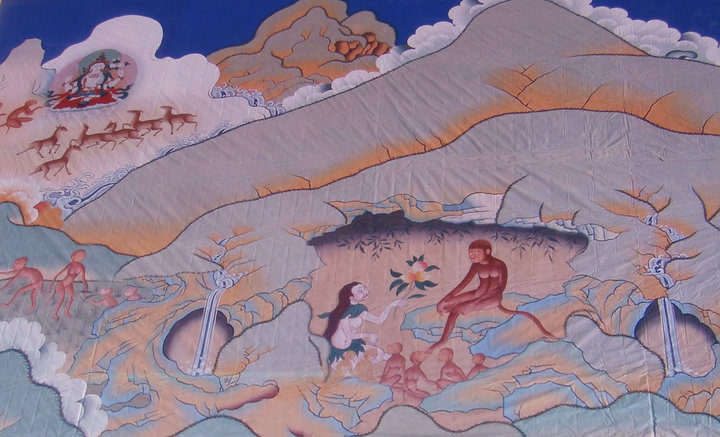
Pa Drengen Changchop Simpa

"Pa Drengen Changchop Simpa" in Tibetan

Pha Trelgen Changchup Sempa (Tibetan: ཕ་སྤྲེལ་རྒན་བྱང་ཆུབ་སེམས་པ།, Wylie: pha sprel rgan byang chub sems pa) is a mythical monkey-ancestor of the Tibetan people. With King Gesar and Avalokiteśvara, of whom he is an incarnation, he is one of the most important figures in Tibetan culture. Pha means "father", Trelgen "old monkey" and Changchup Sempa refers to the bodhisattva (Changchub meaning "enlightenment" and Sempa meaning "intention").

== Birth of the first Tibetans ==
A very popular Tibetan creation myth holds that in the beginning the world was covered by water, which evaporated little by little, leaving room for animal life. To the flooded land of Tibet came a monkey that had withdrawn there to immerse himself in meditation and to follow a life of asceticism and chastity. He settled on Mount Gongori. One day, while he sat in meditation, a female demon named Ma Drag Sinmo came to seduce him. Tradition has it that she was the manifestation of the bodhisattva Tara (Jetsun Dolma in Tibetan), a symbol of compassion and protector of merchants and travelers. She threatened that if he refused to sleep with her she would visit a demon and conceive a multitude of small monsters that would destroy all living creatures. The wise monkey yielded and requested Avalokiteśvara's authorization to marry her. Avalokiteśvara blessed the monkey and the female demon, and a few months later six small monkeys were born of their union. The monkey let his six children grow up in the forest, but three years later he discovered that they had become five hundred. The fruits of the forest were no longer sufficient to feed them, and the five hundred monkeys beseeched their father to help them find food. Not knowing what to do, he went again to ask help from the god of compassion. Then Avalokiteśvara went on the mount Meru, or Sumeru (believed to correspond to today's Mount Kailash), a sacred place for Buddhists, Hindus, Jains and Bönpo. Some say that at the top of the mountain he gathered a handful of barley, others that he extracted five cereals from his own body to offer to the monkey father. Then the monkey father learned agriculture and, after a good harvest, could finally feed all his children. As they fed on the cereals, the monkeys gradually lost their hair and their tails. They also started to use bone and stone implements, then made clothes and built houses, forming a civilization from which the Tibetan people descended.

== Another version ==
Another account says that, seeing the world peopled by demons, Avalokiteśvara the bodhisattva of compassion took pity on the Earth, incarnated himself as a monkey and mated with an ogress of the rock. From this union were born six monkeys, which represent the six principal clans of the Tibetan people.

== See also ==
- History of Tibet
- Hanuman
- Sun Wukong

== Bibliography ==
SEGARRA André, Du Singe au Signe ou la figure du Trickster à travers les deux principaux personages du Rāmāyaṇa et du Xīyóu jì : Hanuman et Sun Wukong, mémoire de littérature sous la direction de Valérie Deshoulières, Université Blaise Pascal, Clermont-Ferrand, 2007.
