= History of Tibet =

While the Tibetan Plateau has been inhabited since pre-historic times, most of Tibet's history went unrecorded until the creation of Tibetan script in the 7th century. Tibetan texts refer to the kingdom of Zhangzhung (c. 500 BC– 625 AD) as the precursor of later Tibetan kingdoms and the originators of the Bon religion. While mythical accounts of early rulers of the Yarlung dynasty exist, historical accounts begin with the introduction of Tibetan script under the unified Tibetan Empire in the 7th century. Following the dissolution of Tibetan Empire and the Era of Fragmentation in the 9th–10th centuries, a Buddhist revival in the 10th–12th centuries saw the development of three of the four major schools of Tibetan Buddhism.

In 13th century, Tibet was conquered by Mongol Empire, followed by a period of Yuan rule (1270–1350). Under Yuan dynasty, Sakya school was favoured and its monks were appointed to the office of Imperial Preceptor which governed Tibet. Tibet effectively became independent in the 14th century and was ruled by a succession of noble houses for the next three centuries. In the 16th century, the title of Dalai Lama was created by Altan Khan, the leader of Tumed Mongols, and as requested by the family of Altan Khan, seal of authority was granted to the Dalai Lama by the Wanli Emperor. In the 17th century, the senior lama of the Gelug school, the Dalai Lama, became the head of state with the aid of the Khoshut Khanate, establishing the Ganden Phodrang, which continued to administer Tibet in one form or other from 1642 to 1959. Seal of authority and golden sheets were granted by the Shunzhi Emperor to both the Dalai Lama and the founder Güshi Khan of Khoshut Khanate in 1653. In 1717, the Dzungar Khanate invaded Lhasa, killed Lha-bzang Khan of the Khoshut Khanate, which effectively destroyed the Khoshut Khanate. The Qing dynasty then sent military troops in the same year to fight the Dzungars, but failed.

In 1720, the Manchu-led Qing dynasty sent troops for the second time and drove away the Dzungar army, bringing Tibet under Qing rule. An imperial edit for Imperial Stele Inscriptions of the Pacification of Tibet was written, and the term Xizang was officially used to designate the region. After the Thirteen Articles for the Settlement of Qinghai Affairs were proposed to Emperor Yongzheng, the borders between Tibet, Qinghai, Sichuan and Yunnan were demarcated.

After the fall of the Qing dynasty in 1911, Tibet under Ganden Phodrang become defacto independent. In 1959, the 14th Dalai Lama went into exile in India in response to hostilities with the People's Republic of China (PRC). The PRC annexation in 1951 and flight of the Dalai Lama created several waves of Tibetan refugees and led to the creation of Tibetan diasporas in India, the United States, and Europe.

The Tibet Autonomous Region was established in 1965 after the Seventeen Point Agreement was ratified in 1951 by the Dalai Lama. Tibetan independence and human rights emerged as international issues, gaining significant visibility alongside the 14th Dalai Lama in the 1980s and 1990s. Chinese authorities have sought to assert control over Tibet and has been accused of the destruction of religious sites and banning possession of pictures of the Dalai Lama and other Tibetan religious practices. During the crises created by the Great Leap Forward, Tibet was subjected to mass starvation. The PRC disputes these claims and points to their investments in Tibetan infrastructure, education, and industrialization as evidence that they have replaced a theocratic feudal government with a modern state.

== Geographical setting ==
Tibet lies between the civilizations of China proper and Indian subcontinent. Extensive mountain ranges to the east of the Tibetan Plateau mark the border with the Chinese heartland, and the Himalayas of the republics of Nepal and India separate the plateau from the subcontinent lying south. Tibet has been called the "roof of the world" and "the land of snows".

Linguists classify the Tibetan language and its dialects as belonging to the Tibeto-Burman languages, the non-Sinitic members of the broader Sino-Tibetan language family.

== Prehistory ==
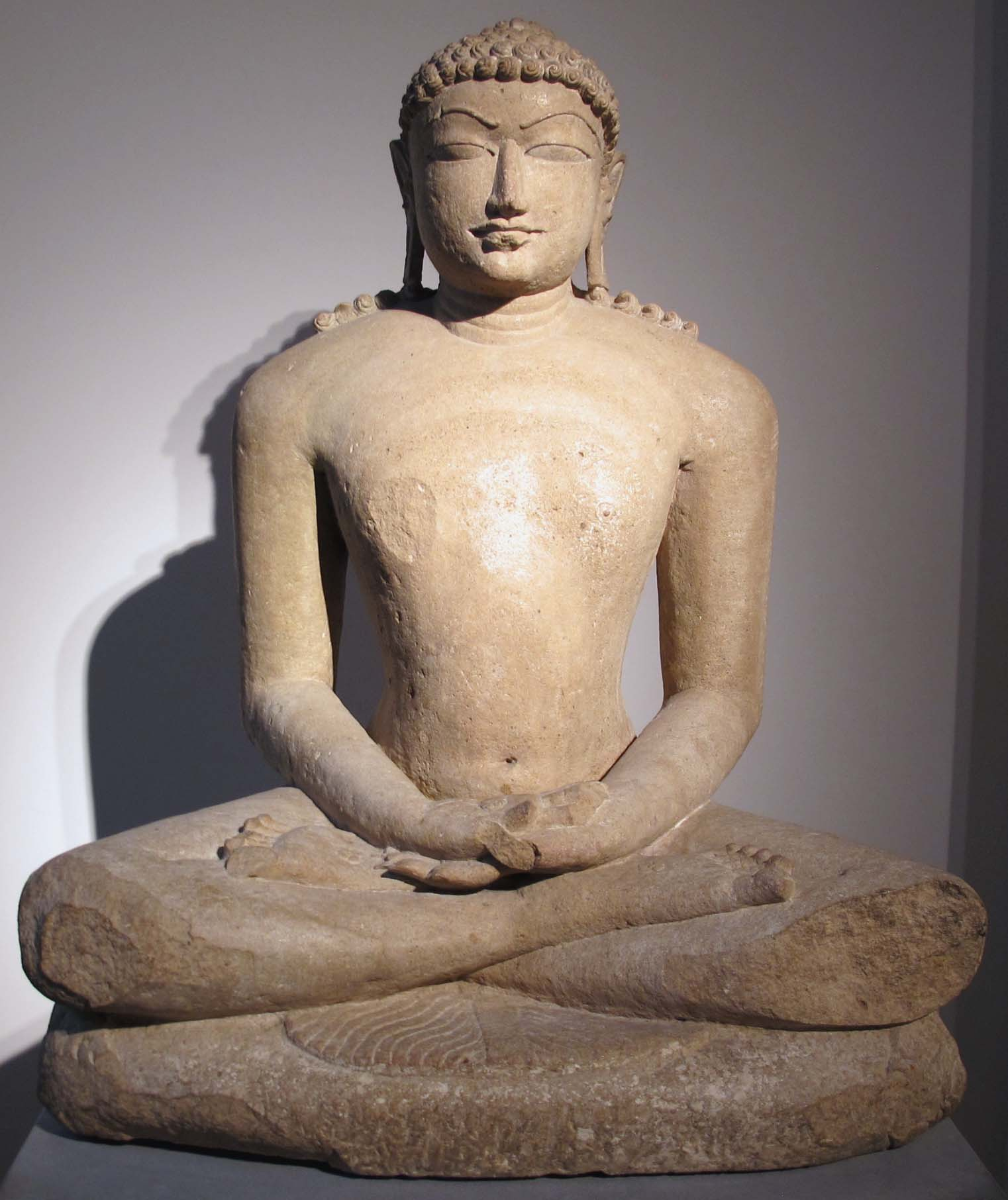
Rishabhanatha, the founder of Jainism, attained nirvana near Mount Kailash in Tibet.

Some archaeological data suggest archaic humans passed through Tibet at the time India was first inhabited, half a million years ago. Impressions of hands and feet suggest hominins were present at the above 4,000 meters above sea level high Tibetan Plateau 169,000–226,000 years ago. Modern humans first inhabited the Tibetan Plateau at least twenty-one thousand years ago. This population was largely replaced around 3000 years ago by Neolithic immigrants from northern China. However, there is a "partial genetic continuity between the Paleolithic inhabitants and the contemporary Tibetan populations". The vast majority of Tibetan maternal mtDNA components can trace their ancestry to both paleolithic and Neolithic during the mid-Holocene.

Megalithic monuments dot the Tibetan Plateau and may have been used in ancestor worship. Prehistoric Iron Age hillforts and burial complexes have recently been found on the Tibetan Plateau, but the remote high altitude location makes archaeological research difficult.

== Early history (c. 500 BC – AD 618) ==
=== Zhangzhung kingdom (c. 500 BC – AD 625) ===
According to Namkhai Norbu some Tibetan historical texts identify the Zhang Zhung culture as a people who migrated from the Amdo region into what is now the region of Guge in western Tibet. Zhang Zhung is considered to be the original home of the Bön religion.

By the 1st century BC, a neighboring kingdom arose in the Yarlung Valley, and the Yarlung king, Drigum Tsenpo, attempted to remove the influence of the Zhang Zhung by expelling the Zhang's Bön priests from Yarlung. Tsenpo was assassinated and Zhang Zhung continued its dominance of the region until it was annexed by Songtsen Gampo in the 7th century.

=== Tibetan tribes (2nd century AD) ===
In AD 108, "the Kiang or Tibetans, a nomad from south-west of Koko-nor, attacked the Chinese posts of Gansu, threatening to cut the Dunhuang road. Liang Kin, at the price of some fierce fighting, held them off." Similar incursions were repelled in AD 168–169 by the Chinese general Duan Gong.

Chinese sources of the same era mention of a Fu state (Chinese: 附国) of either Qiang or Tibetan ethnicity "more than two thousand miles northwest of Shu County". Fu state was pronounced as "bod" or "phyva" in Archaic Chinese. Whether this polity is the precursor of Tufan is still unknown.

=== First kings of the pre-Imperial Yarlung dynasty (2nd–6th centuries) ===
The pre-Imperial Yarlung dynasty rulers are considered mythological because sufficient evidence of their existence has not been found.

Nyatri Tsenpo is considered by traditional histories to have been the first king of the Yarlung dynasty, named after the river valley where its capital city was located, approximately fifty-five miles south-east from present-day Lhasa. The dates attributed to the first Tibetan king, Nyatri Tsenpo (Wylie: Gnya'-khri-btsan-po), vary. Some Tibetan texts give 126 BC, others 414 BC.

Nyatri Tsenpo is said to have descended from a one-footed creature called the Theurang, having webbed fingers and a tongue so large it could cover his face. Due to his terrifying appearance he was feared in his native Puwo and exiled by the Bön to Tibet. There he was greeted as a fearsome being, and he became king.

The Tibetan kings were said to remain connected to the heavens via a dmu cord (dmu thag) so that rather than dying, they ascended directly to heaven, when their sons achieved their majority. According to various accounts, king Drigum Tsenpo (Dri-gum-brtsan-po) either challenged his clan heads to a fight, or provoked his groom Longam (Lo-ngam) into a duel. During the fight the king's dmu cord was cut, and he was killed. Thereafter Drigum Tsenpo and subsequent kings left corpses and the Bön conducted funerary rites.

In a later myth, first attested in the Maṇi bka' 'bum, the Tibetan people are the progeny of the union of the monkey Pha Trelgen Changchup Sempa and rock ogress Ma Drag Sinmo. But the monkey was a manifestation of the bodhisattva Chenresig, or Avalokiteśvara (Tib. Spyan-ras-gzigs) while the ogress in turn incarnated Chenresig's consort Dolma (Tib. 'Grol-ma).

== Tibetan Empire (618–842) ==
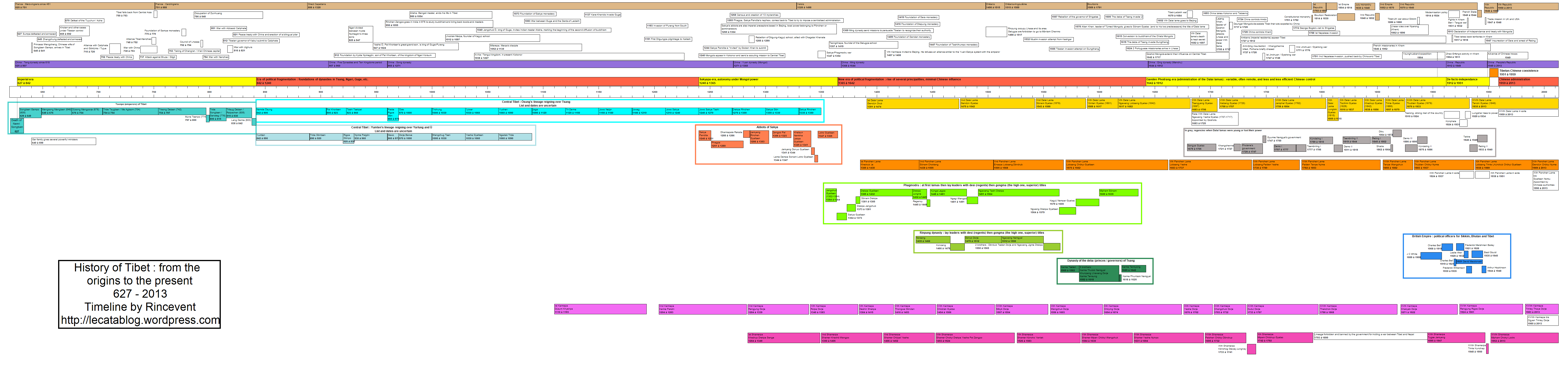
Historical timeline of Tibet (627–2013)

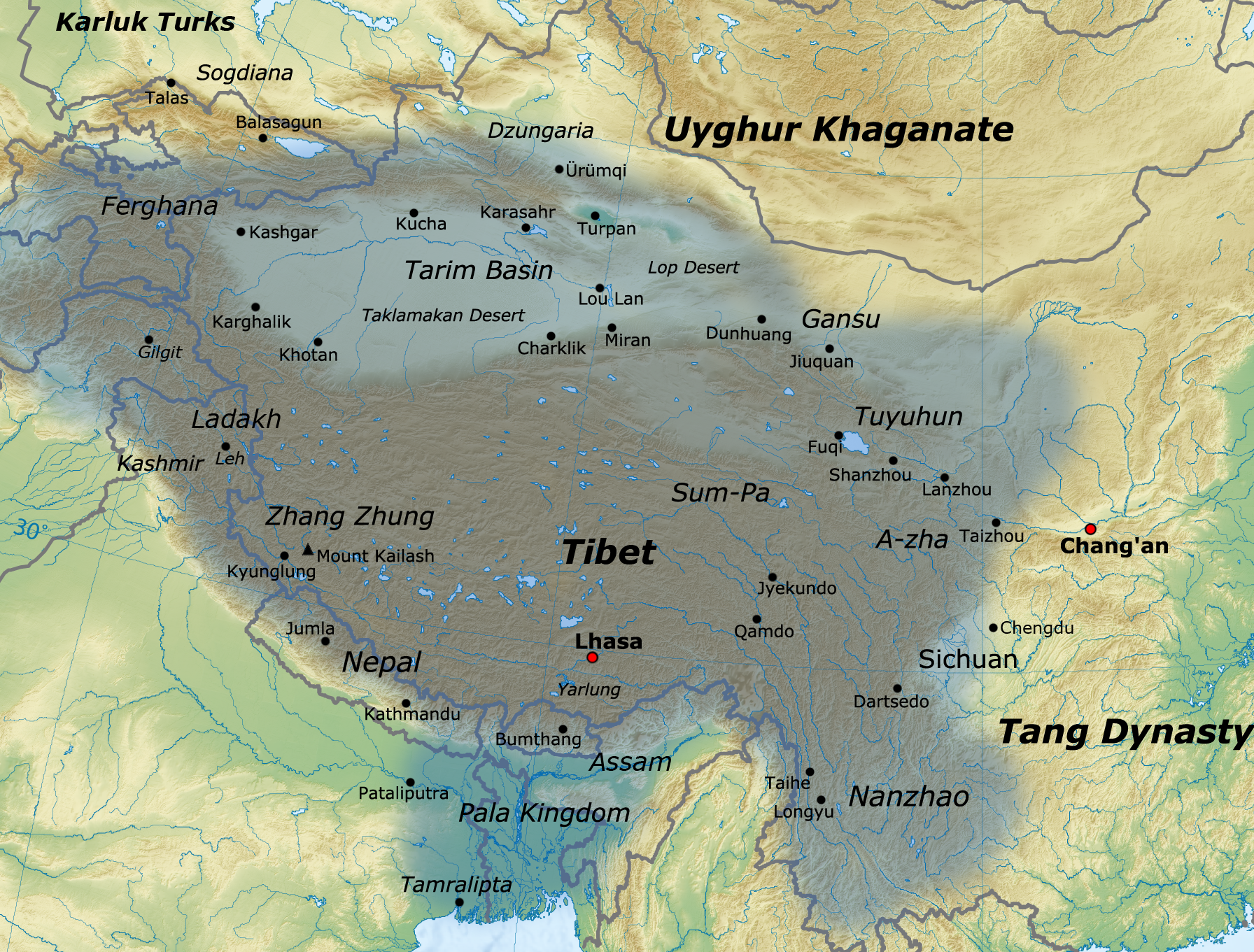
The Tibetan Empire at its greatest extent between the 780s and the 790s AD

The Yarlung kings gradually extended their control, and by the early 6th century most of the Tibetan tribes were under its control, when Namri Songtsen (570?–618?/629), the 32nd King of Tibet of the Yarlung dynasty, gained control of all the area around what is now Lhasa by 630, and conquered Zhangzhung. With this extent of power the Yarlung kingdom turned into the Tibetan Empire.

The government of Namri Songtsen sent two embassies to China in 608 and 609, marking the appearance of Tibet on the international scene. From the 7th century AD Chinese historians referred to Tibet as Tubo (吐蕃), though four distinct characters were used. The first externally confirmed contact with the Tibetan kingdom in recorded Tibetan history occurred when King Namri Löntsän (Gnam-ri-slon-rtsan) sent an ambassador to China in the early 7th century.

Traditional Tibetan history preserves a lengthy list of rulers whose exploits become subject to external verification in the Chinese histories by the 7th century. From the 7th to the 11th centuries a series of emperors ruled Tibet (see List of emperors of Tibet) of whom the three most important in later religious tradition were Songtsen Gampo, Trisong Detsen and Ralpacan, "the three religious kings" (mes-dbon gsum), who were assimilated to the three protectors (rigs-gsum mgon-po), respectively, Avalokiteśvara, Mañjuśrī and Vajrapāni. Songtsen Gampo (c. 604–650) was the first great emperor who expanded Tibet's power beyond Lhasa and the Yarlung Valley, and is traditionally credited with introducing Buddhism to Tibet.

Throughout the centuries from the time of the emperor the power of the empire gradually increased over a diverse terrain so that by the reign of the emperor in the opening years of the 9th century, its influence extended as far south as Bengal and as far north as Mongolia. Tibetan records claim that the Pala Empire was conquered and that the Pala emperor Dharmapala submitted to Tibet, though no independent evidence confirms this.

The varied terrain of the empire and the difficulty of transportation, coupled with the new ideas that came into the empire as a result of its expansion, helped to create stresses and power blocs that were often in competition with the ruler at the center of the empire. Thus, for example, adherents of the Bön religion and the supporters of the ancient noble families gradually came to find themselves in competition with the recently introduced Buddhism.

== Era of Fragmentation and Cultural Renaissance (9th–12th centuries) ==
=== Fragmentation of political power (9th–10th centuries) ===
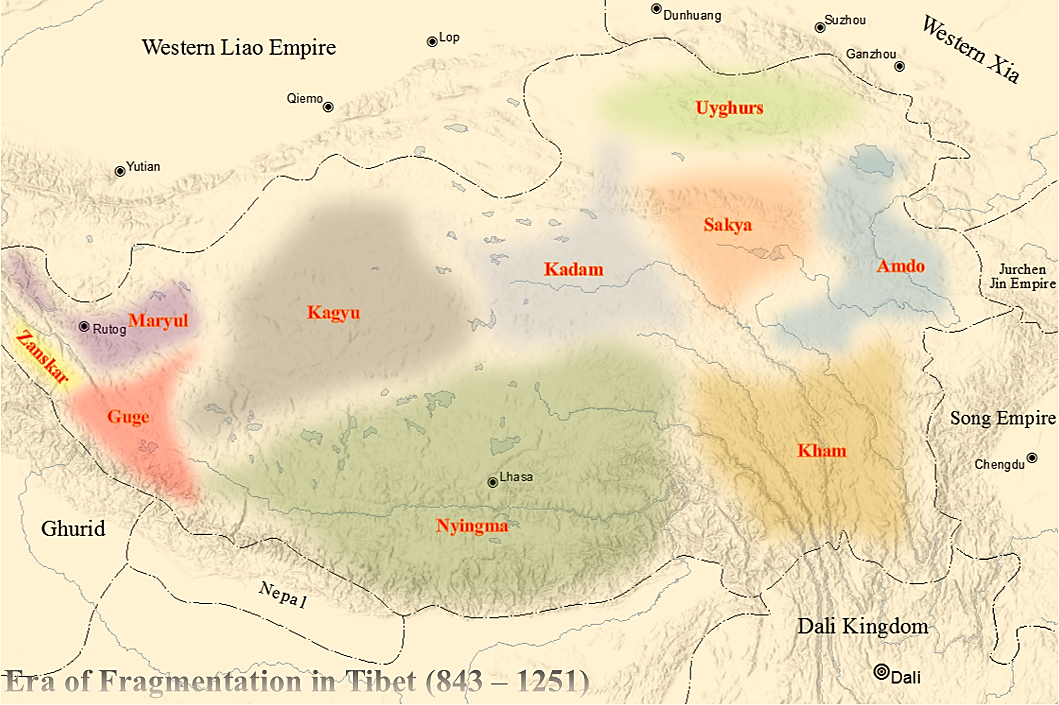
Map showing major religious regimes during the Era of Fragmentation in Tibet

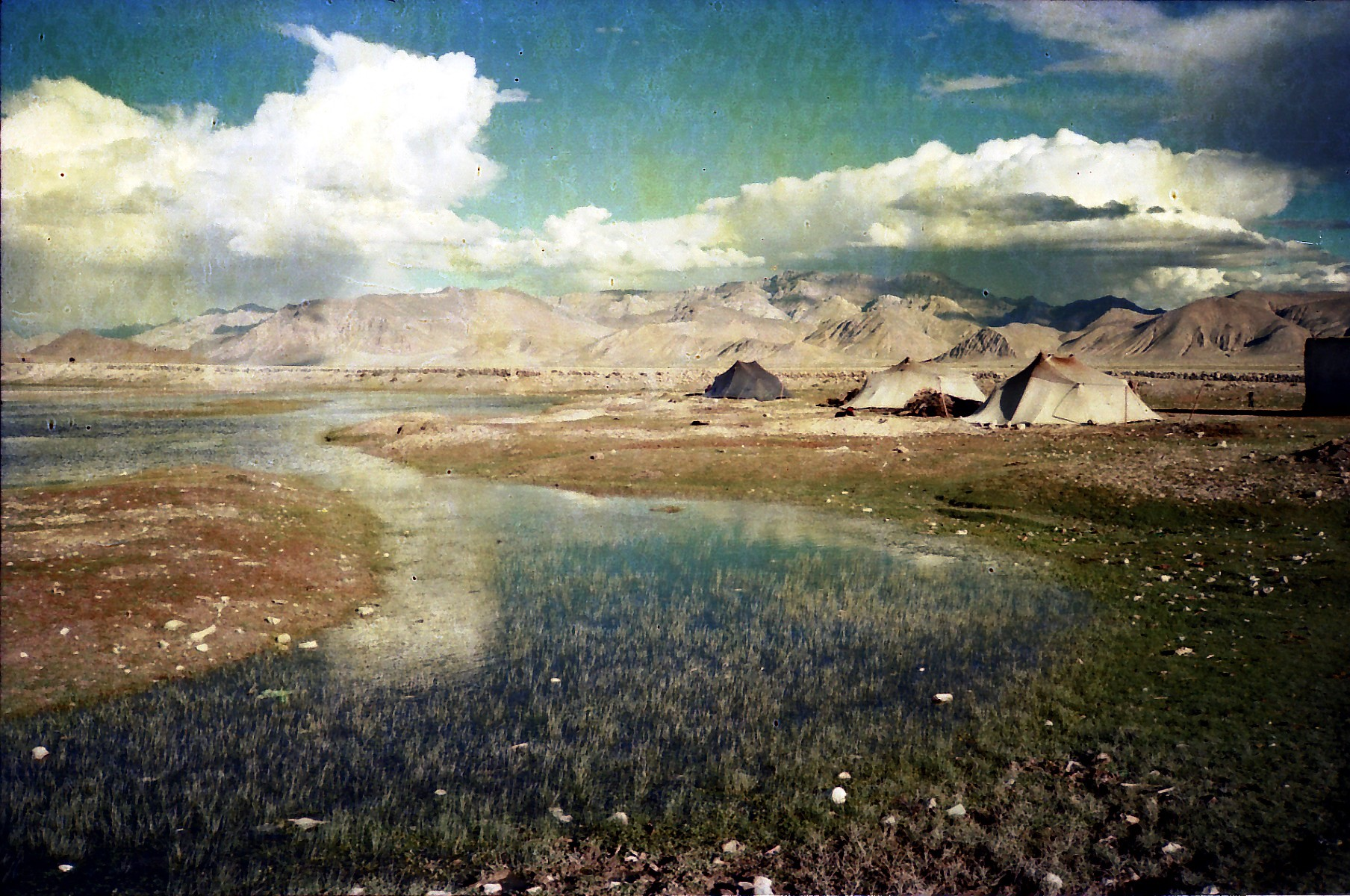
Nomad camp near Tingri Tibet, 1993

The Era of Fragmentation was a period of Tibetan history in the 9th and 10th centuries. During this era, the political centralization of the earlier Tibetan Empire collapsed. The period was dominated by rebellions against the remnants of imperial Tibet and the rise of regional warlords. Upon the death of Langdarma, the last emperor of a unified Tibetan empire, there was a controversy over whether he would be succeeded by his alleged heir Yumtän (Yum brtan), or by another son (or nephew) Ösung ('Od-srung; either 843–905 or 847–885). A civil war ensued, which effectively ended centralized Tibetan administration until the Sa-skya period. Ösung's allies managed to keep control of Lhasa, and Yumtän was forced to go to Yalung, where he established a separate line of kings. In 910, the tombs of the emperors were defiled.

The son of Ösung was Pälkhortsän (Dpal 'khor brtsan; 865–895 or 893–923). The latter apparently maintained control over much of central Tibet for a time, and sired two sons, Trashi Tsentsän (Bkra shis brtsen brtsan) and Thrikhyiding (Khri khyi lding), also called Kyide Nyimagön (Skyid lde nyi ma mgon) in some sources. Thrikhyiding migrated to the western Tibetan region of upper Ngari (Stod Mnga ris) and married a woman of high central Tibetan nobility, with whom he founded a local dynasty.

After the breakup of the Tibetan Empire in 842, Nyima-Gon, a representative of the ancient Tibetan royal house, founded the first Ladakh dynasty. Nyima-Gon's kingdom had its centre well to the east of present-day Ladakh. Kyide Nyigön's eldest son became ruler of the Maryul (Ladakh region), and his two younger sons ruled western Tibet, founding the Kingdom of Guge– Purang and Zanskar– Spiti. Later the king of Guge's eldest son, Kor-re, also called Jangchub Yeshe-Ö (Byang Chub Ye shes' Od), became a Buddhist monk. He sent young scholars to Kashmir for training and was responsible for inviting Atiśa to Tibet in 1040, thus ushering in the Chidar (Phyi dar) phase of Buddhism in Tibet. The younger son, Srong-nge, administered day-to-day governmental affairs; it was his sons who carried on the royal line.

=== Tibetan Renaissance (10th–12th centuries) ===
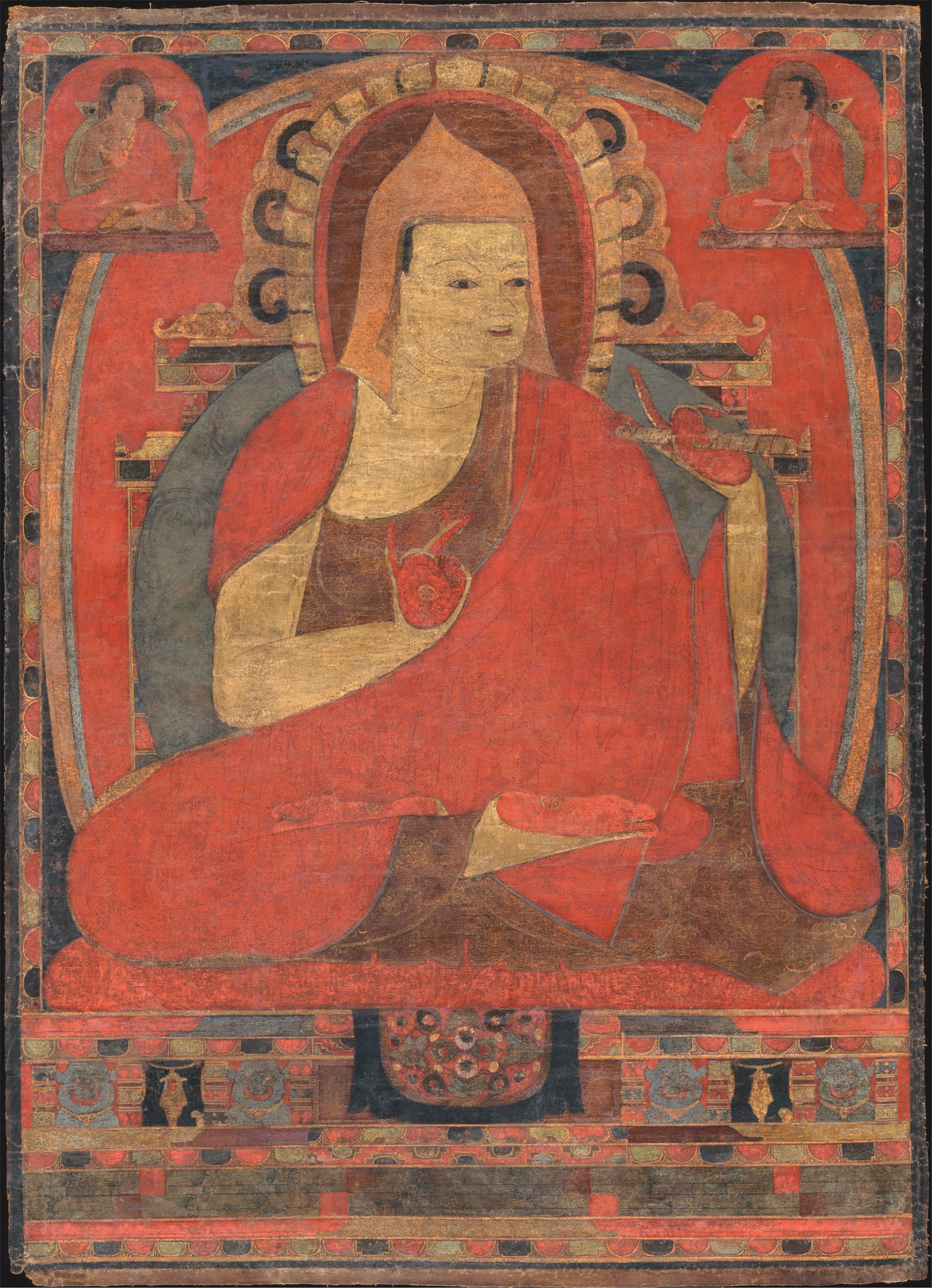
Atiśa lived during the 11th century and was one of the major figures in the spread of Mahayana and Vajrayana Buddhism in Asia and inspired Buddhist thought from Tibet to Sumatra.

According to traditional accounts, Buddhism had survived surreptitiously in the region of Kham. The late 10th century and 11th century saw a revival of Buddhism in Tibet. Coinciding with the early discoveries of "hidden treasures" (terma), the 11th century saw a revival of Buddhist influence originating in the far east and far west of Tibet.

Muzu Saelbar (Mu-zu gSal-'bar), later known as the scholar Gongpa Rabsal (bla chen dgongs pa rab gsal; 832–915), was responsible for the renewal of Buddhism in northeastern Tibet, and is counted as the progenitor of the Nyingma (Rnying ma pa) school of Tibetan Buddhism. In the west, Rinchen Zangpo (958–1055) was active as a translator and founded temples and monasteries. Prominent scholars and teachers were again invited from India.

In 1042 Atiśa (982–1054 CE) arrived in Tibet at the invitation of a west Tibetan king. This renowned exponent of the Pāla form of Buddhism from the Indian university of Vikramashila later moved to central Tibet. There his chief disciple, Dromtonpa, founded the Kadampa school of Tibetan Buddhism under whose influence the New Translation schools of today evolved.

The Sakya, the Grey Earth school, was founded by Khön Könchok Gyelpo (Wylie: 'khon dkon mchog rgyal po, 1034–1102), a disciple of the great Lotsawa, Drogmi Shākya (Wylie: brog mi lo tsā wa ye shes). It is headed by the Sakya Trizin, traces its lineage to the mahasiddha Virūpa, and represents the scholarly tradition. A renowned exponent, Sakya Pandita (1182–1251CE), was the great-grandson of Khön Könchok Gyelpo.

Other seminal Indian teachers were Tilopa (988–1069) and his student Naropa (probably died ca. 1040 CE). The Kagyu, the Lineage of the (Buddha's) Word, is an oral tradition which is very much concerned with the experiential dimension of meditation. Its most famous exponent was Milarepa, an 11th-century mystic. It contains one major and one minor subsect. The first, the Dagpo Kagyu, encompasses those Kagyu schools that trace back to the Indian master Naropa via Marpa Lotsawa, Milarepa and Gampopa.

== Mongol conquest and Yuan administrative rule (1240–1354) ==
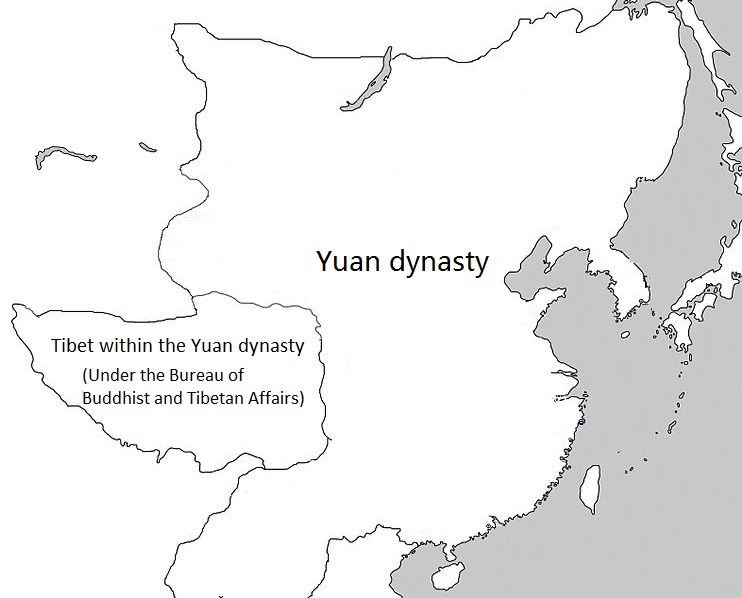
Tibet within the Yuan dynasty under the top-level department known as the Bureau of Buddhist and Tibetan Affairs (Xuanzheng Yuan)

During this era, the region was dominated by the Sakya lama with the Mongols' support, so it is also called the Sakya dynasty. The first documented contact between the Tibetans and the Mongols occurred when the missionary Tsang-pa Dung-khur (gTsang-pa Dung-khur-ba) and six disciples met Genghis Khan, probably on the Tangut border where he may have been taken captive, around 1221–22. He left Mongolia as the Quanzhen sect of Daoism gained the upper hand, but remet Genghis Khan when Mongols conquered Tangut shortly before the Khan's death. Closer contacts ensued when the Mongols successively sought to move through the Sino-Tibetan borderlands to attack the Jin dynasty and then the Southern Song, with incursions on outlying areas. One traditional Tibetan account claims that there was a plot to invade Tibet by Genghis Khan in 1206, which is considered anachronistic as there is no evidence of Mongol-Tibetan encounters prior to the military campaign in 1240. The mistake may have arisen from Genghis's real campaign against the Tangut Xixia.

The Mongols invaded Tibet in 1240 with a small campaign led by the Mongol general Doorda Darkhan that consisted of 30,000 troops. The invasion resulted in 500 Tibetan casualties. The Mongols withdrew their soldiers from Tibet in 1241, as all the Mongol princes were recalled back to Mongolia in preparation for the appointment of a successor to Ögedei Khan. They returned to the region in 1244, when Köten delivered an ultimatum, summoning the abbot of Sakya (Kun-dga' rGyal-mtshan) to be his personal chaplain, on pains of a larger invasion were he to refuse. Sakya Paṇḍita took almost 3 years to obey the summons and arrive in Kokonor in 1246, and met Prince Köten in Lanzhou the following year. The Mongols had annexed Amdo and Kham to the east, and appointed Sakya Paṇḍita Viceroy of Central Tibet by the Mongol court in 1249.

Tibet was incorporated into the Mongol Empire, retaining nominal power over religious and regional political affairs, while the Mongols managed a structural and administrative rule over the region, reinforced by the rare military intervention. This existed as a "diarchic structure" under the Mongol emperor, with power primarily in favor of the Mongols. Within the branch of the Mongol Empire in China known as the Yuan dynasty, Tibet was managed by the Bureau of Buddhist and Tibetan Affairs or Xuanzheng Yuan, separate from other Yuan provinces such as those governed the former Song dynasty of China. One of the department's purposes was to select a dpon-chen, usually appointed by the lama and confirmed by the Yuan emperor in Beijing. "The Mongol dominance was most indirect: Sakya lamas remained the sources of authority and legitimacy, while the dpon-chens carried on the administration at Sakya. When a dispute developed between dpon-chen Kung-dga' bzari-po and one of 'Phags-pa's relatives at Sakya, the Chinese troops were dispatched to execute the dpon-chen."

In 1253, Drogön Chögyal Phagpa (1235–1280) succeeded Sakya Pandita at the Mongol court. Phagpa became a religious teacher to Kublai Khan. Kublai Khan appointed Chögyal Phagpa as his Imperial Preceptor (originally State Preceptor) in 1260, the year when he became Khagan. Phagpa developed the priest-patron concept that characterized Tibeto-Mongolian relations from that point forward. With the support of Kublai Khan, Phagpa established himself and his sect as the preeminent political power in Tibet. Through their influence with the Mongol rulers, Tibetan lamas gained considerable influence in various Mongol clans, not only with Kublai, but, for example, also with the Il-Khanids.

In 1265, Chögyal Phagpa returned to Tibet and for the first time made an attempt to impose Sakya hegemony with the appointment of Shakya Bzang-po, a longtime servant and ally of the Sakyas, as the dpon-chen ('great administrator') over Tibet in 1267. A census was conducted in 1268 and Tibet was divided into thirteen myriarchies (administrative districts, nominally containing 10,000 households). By the end of the century, Western Tibet lay under the effective control of imperial officials (almost certainly Tibetans) dependent on the 'Great Administrator', while the kingdoms of Guge and Pu-ran retained their internal autonomy.

The Sakya hegemony over Tibet continued into the mid-14th century, although it was challenged by a revolt of the Drikung Kagyu sect with the assistance of Duwa Khan of the Chagatai Khanate in 1285. The revolt was suppressed in 1290 when the Sakyas and eastern Mongols burned Drikung Monastery and killed 10,000 people.

Between 1346 and 1354, towards the end of the Yuan dynasty, the House of Pagmodru would topple the Sakya. The rule over Tibet by a succession of Sakya lamas came to a definite end in 1358, when central Tibet came under control of the Kagyu sect. "By the 1370s, the lines between the schools of Buddhism were clear."

The following 80-or-so years were a period of relative stability. They also saw the birth of the Gelugpa school (also known as Yellow Hats) by the disciples of Tsongkhapa Lobsang Dragpa, and the founding of the Ganden, Drepung, and Sera monasteries near Lhasa. After the 1430s, the country entered another period of internal power struggles.

== Tibetan independence (14th–18th century) ==
With the decline of the Yuan dynasty, Central Tibet was ruled by successive families from 14th to 17th centuries, to be succeeded by the Dalai Lama's rule in the 17th and 18th centuries. Tibet would be de facto independent from the mid-14th century on, for nearly 400 years. In spite of the weakening of central authority, the neighbouring Ming dynasty of China made little effort to impose direct rule, although it had nominal claims of the Tibetan territory by establishing the U-Tsang Regional Military Commission and Do-Kham Regional Military Commission in the 1370s. They also kept friendly relations with some of the Buddhism religious leaders known as Princes of Dharma and granted some other titles to local leaders including the Grand Imperial Tutor.

=== Family rule (14th–17th centuries) ===
==== Phagmodrupa (14th–15th centuries) ====
The Phagmodru (Phag mo gru) myriarchy centered at Neudong (Sne'u gdong) was granted as an appanage to Hülegü in 1251. The area had already been associated with the Lang (Rlang) family, and with the waning of Ilkhanate influence it was ruled by this family, within the Mongol-Sakya framework headed by the Mongol appointed Pönchen (dpon-chen) at Sakya. The areas under Lang administration were continually encroached upon during the late 13th and early 14th centuries. Jangchub Gyaltsän (Byang chub rgyal mtshan, 1302–1364) saw these encroachments as illegal and sought the restoration of Phagmodru lands after his appointment as the Myriarch in 1322. After prolonged legal struggles, the struggle became violent when Phagmodru was attacked by its neighbours in 1346. Jangchub Gyaltsän was arrested and released in 1347. When he later refused to appear for trial, his domains were attacked by the Pönchen in 1348. Janchung Gyaltsän was able to defend Phagmodru, and continued to have military successes, until by 1351 he was the strongest political figure in the country. Military hostilities ended in 1354 with Jangchub Gyaltsän as the unquestioned victor, who established the Phagmodrupa dynasty in that year. He continued to rule central Tibet until his death in 1364, although he left all Mongol institutions in place as hollow formalities. Power remained in the hands of the Phagmodru family until 1434.

The rule of Jangchub Gyaltsän and his successors implied a new cultural self-awareness where models were sought in the age of the ancient Tibetan Kingdom. The relatively peaceful conditions favoured the literary and artistic development. During this period the reformist scholar Je Tsongkhapa (1357–1419) founded the Gelug sect which would have a decisive influence on Tibet's history.

==== Rinpungpa family (15th–16th centuries) ====
Internal strife within the Phagmodrupa dynasty and the strong localism of the various fiefs and political-religious factions led to a long series of internal conflicts. The minister family Rinpungpa, based in Tsang (West Central Tibet), dominated politics after 1435.

==== Tsangpa dynasty (16th–17th centuries) ====
In 1565 they were overthrown by the Tsangpa dynasty of Shigatse which expanded its power in different directions of Tibet in the following decades and favoured the Karma Kagyu sect. They would play a pivotal role in the events which led to the rise of power of the Dalai Lamas in the 1640s.

=== Ganden Phodrang government (17th–18th centuries) ===
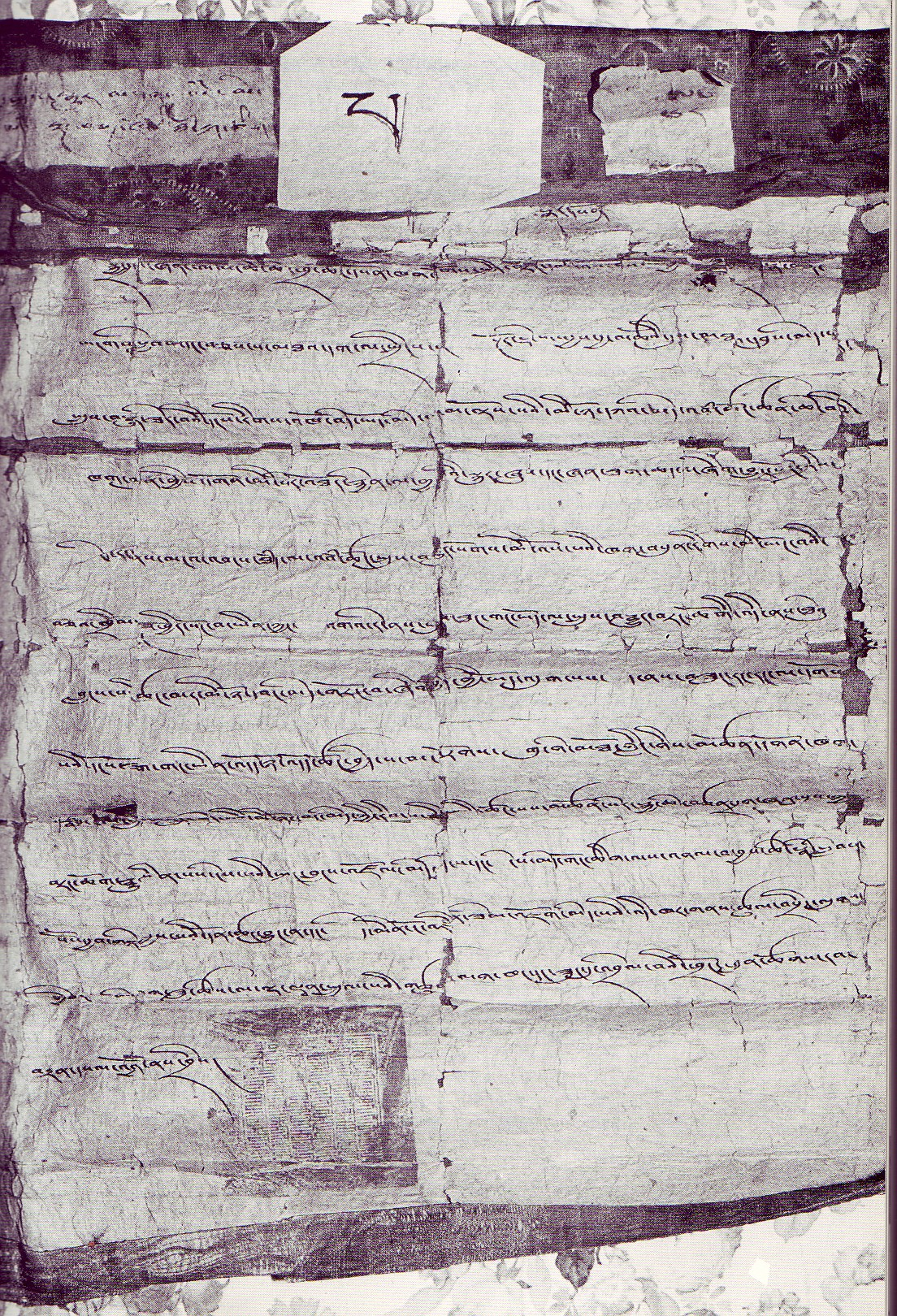
Legal Document of the Tibetan Ruler Lha-bzang Khan

The Ganden Phodrang was the Tibetan government established in 1642 by the 5th Dalai Lama with the military assistance of Güshi Khan of the Khoshut Khanate. Lhasa became the capital of Tibet in the beginning of this period, with all temporal power being conferred to the 5th Dalai Lama by Güshi Khan in Shigatse.

==== Rise of the Gelugpa school and the Dalai Lama ====
The rise of the Dalai Lamas was intimately connected with the military power of Mongolian clans. Altan Khan, the king of the Tümed Mongols, first invited Sonam Gyatso, the head of the Gelugpa school of Tibetan Buddhism (later known as the third Dalai Lama), to Mongolia in 1569 and again in 1578, during the reign of the Tsangpa family. Gyatso accepted the second invitation. They met at the site of Altan Khan's new capital, Koko Khotan (Hohhot), and the Dalai Lama taught a large crowd there.

Sonam Gyatso publicly announced that he was a reincarnation of the Tibetan Sakya monk Drogön Chögyal Phagpa (1235–1280) who converted Kublai Khan, while Altan Khan was a reincarnation of Kublai Khan (1215–1294), the famous ruler of the Mongols and Emperor of China, and that they had come together again to cooperate in propagating the Buddhist religion. While this did not immediately lead to a massive conversion of Mongols to Buddhism (this would only happen in the 1630s), it did lead to the widespread use of Buddhist ideology for the legitimation of power among the Mongol nobility. Last but not least, Yonten Gyatso, the fourth Dalai Lama, was a grandson of Altan Khan.

==== Khoshut-Gelugpa alliance ====
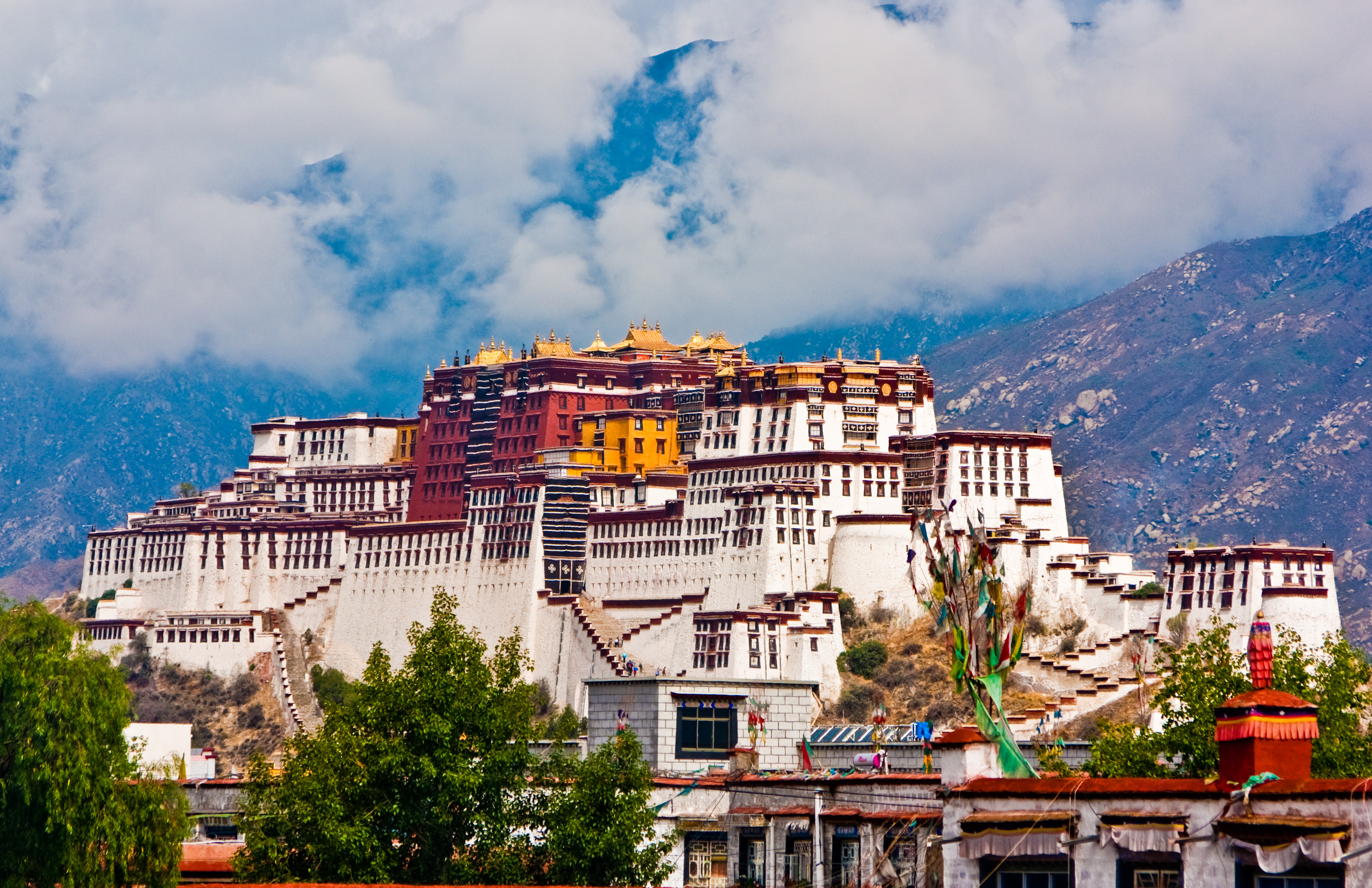
The Potala Palace in Lhasa

Yonten Gyatso (1589–1616), the fourth Dalai Lama and a non-Tibetan, was the grandson of Altan Khan. He died in 1616 in his mid-twenties. Some people say he was poisoned but there is no real evidence one way or the other.

Lobsang Gyatso (Wylie transliteration: Blo-bzang Rgya-mtsho), the Great Fifth Dalai Lama (1617–1682), was the first Dalai Lama to wield effective political power over central Tibet.

The Fifth Dalai Lama's first regent Sonam Rapten is known for unifying the Tibetan heartland under the control of the Gelug school of Tibetan Buddhism, after defeating the rival Kagyu and Jonang sects and the secular ruler, the Tsangpa prince, in a prolonged civil war. His efforts were in large part successful due to the military aid contributed by Güshi Khan, the Oirat Khoshut leader of the Khoshut Khanate. The positions of the Dalai Lama, Sonam Rapten, and the khans have been subject to various interpretations. Some sources claim the khan appointed Sonam Rapten as de facto administrator of civil affairs while the Dalai Lama was relegated to religious matters. Other sources claim that Güshi Khan was largely uninvolved in the administration of Tibet and remained in Kokonor after defeating the enemies of the Gelugpa school.

The 5th Dalai Lama and his intimates, especially Sonam Rapten (until his death in 1658), established a civil administration referred to by historians as the Lhasa state. This Tibetan administration is also referred to as the Ganden Phodrang, named after the 5th Dalai Lama's residence in Drepung Monastery.

Sonam Rapten was a fanatical and militant proponent of the Gelugpa. Under his administration, the other schools were persecuted. Jonang sources today claim that the Jonang monasteries were either closed or forcibly converted, and that school remained in hiding until the latter part of the 20th century. However, before leaving Tibet for China in 1652 the Dalai Lama issued a proclamation or decree to Sonam Rapten banning all such sectarian policies that had been implemented by his administration after the 1642 civil war, and ordered their reversal. According to FitzHerbert and, there was an increase in the 5th Dalai Lama's "day-to-day control of ... his government" after the deaths of Sonam Rapten and Güshi Khan in the 1650s.

The 5th Dalai Lama initiated the construction of the Potala Palace in Lhasa in 1645. During the rule of the Great Fifth, two Jesuit missionaries, the German Johannes Gruber and Belgian Albert Dorville, stayed in Lhasa for two months, October and November, 1661 on their way from Peking to Portuguese Goa, in India. In 1652, the 5th Dalai Lama visited the Shunzhi Emperor of the Qing dynasty. He was not required to kowtow like other visitors, but still had to kneel before the Emperor; and he was later sent an official seal.

The death of the 5th Dalai Lama in 1682 was kept hidden for fifteen years by his assistant confidant, Desi Sangye Gyatso. The 6th Dalai Lama, Tsangyang Gyatso, was enthroned in the Potala on 7 or 8 December 1697. In 1705–6, conflict between the 6th Dalai Lama's regent and the Khoshut Khanate led to the seizure of Lhasa by Lha-bzang Khan, who murdered the regent and deposed the 6th Dalai Lama. A pretender, Yeshe Gyatso, was installed by Lha-bzang until the Dzungar Khanate invaded in 1717 and removed the Khoshut khan and pretender from power. The 7th Dalai Lama was installed but the Dzungars terrorized the people, leading to loss of goodwill from the Tibetans. The Dzungars were ousted in 1720 by the Qing dynasty.

== Qing conquest and administrative rule (1720–1912) ==
The Qing rule over Tibet was established after a Qing expedition forces defeated the Dzungars who occupied Tibet until 1720. The Qing rule lasted until the fall of the Qing dynasty in 1912. The Qing emperors appointed imperial residents known as the Ambans to Tibet, who commanded over 2,000 troops stationed in Lhasa and reported to the Lifan Yuan, a Qing government agency that oversaw the region during this period. During this era, the region was dominated by the Dalai Lamas with the support from the Qing dynasty established by the Manchus in China.

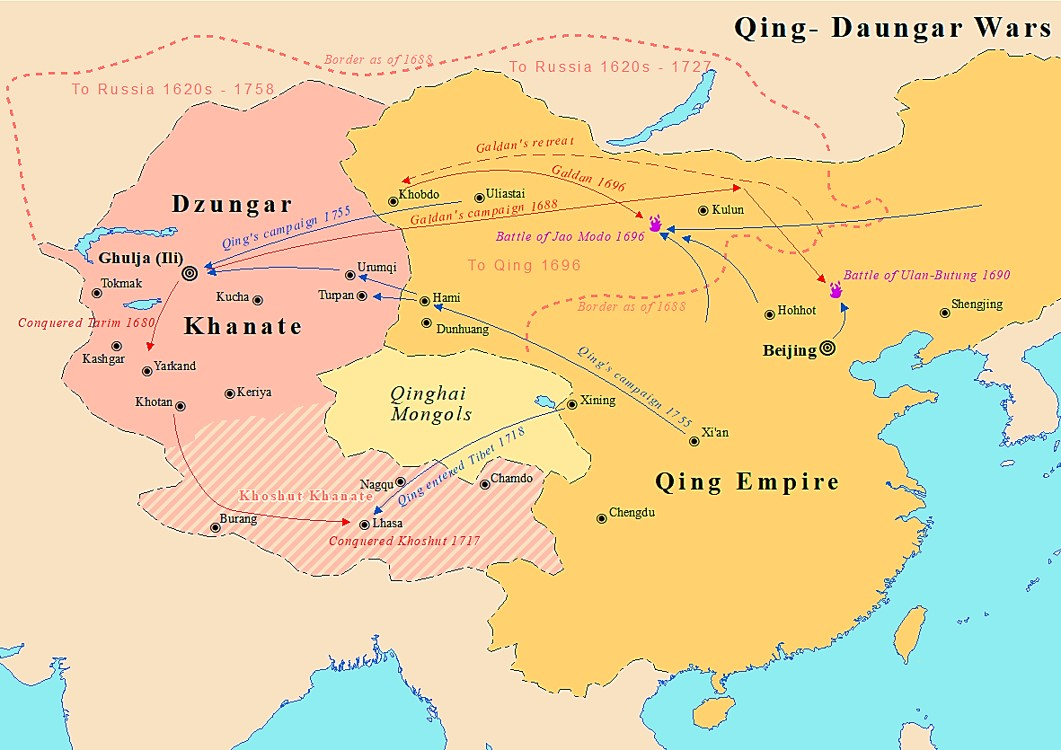
Map showing Dzungar–Qing Wars between the Qing dynasty and Dzungar Khanate

=== Qing rule ===
Tibet within the Qing dynasty in 1820

==== Qing conquest ====
The Kangxi Emperor of the Qing dynasty sent an expedition army to Tibet in response to the occupation of Tibet by the forces of the Dzungar Khanate, together with Tibetan forces under Polhanas (also spelled Polhaney) of Tsang and Kangchennas (also spelled Gangchenney), the governor of Western Tibet, they expelled the Dzungars from Tibet in 1720. In 1720, Emperor Kangxi wrote an imperial edict for Imperial Stele Inscriptions of the Pacification of Tibet, and Xizang (Chinese:西藏) was officially used to designate the region, the Tibetan term for Xizang is Bod, the Manchu term for Xizang is Wargi Dzang, and the Mongol term for Xizang is Töbed. In 1724, after the Thirteen Articles for the Settlement of Qinghai Affairs (Chinese: 青海善后事宜十三条) were poposed to Emperor Yongzheng, the borders between Tibet, Qinghai, Sichuan and Yunnan were demarcated and determined. The Qing brought Kelzang Gyatso with them from Kumbum to Lhasa and he was installed as the 7th Dalai Lama. In 1721, the Qing established a government in Lhasa consisting of a council (the Kashag) of three Tibetan ministers, headed by Kangchennas. The Dalai Lama's role at this time was purely symbolic, but still highly influential because of the Mongols' religious beliefs.

After the succession of the Yongzheng Emperor in 1722, a series of reductions of Qing forces in Tibet occurred. However, Lhasa nobility who had been allied with the Dzungars killed Kangchennas and took control of Lhasa in 1727, and Polhanas fled to his native Ngari. Qing troops arrived in Lhasa in September, and punished the anti-Qing faction by executing entire families, including women and children. The Dalai Lama was sent to Lithang Monastery in Kham. The Panchen Lama was brought to Lhasa and was given temporal authority over Tsang and Ngari, creating a territorial division between the two high lamas that was to be a long lasting feature of Chinese policy toward Tibet. Two ambans were established in Lhasa, with increased numbers of Qing troops. Over the 1730s, Qing troops were again reduced, and Polhanas gained more power and authority. The Dalai Lama returned to Lhasa in 1735, temporal power remained with Polhanas. The Qing found Polhanas to be a loyal agent and an effective ruler over a stable Tibet, so he remained dominant until his death in 1747.

At multiple places such as Lhasa, Batang, Dartsendo, Lhari, Chamdo, and Litang, Green Standard Army troops were garrisoned throughout the Dzungar war. Green Standard Army troops and Manchu Bannermen were both part of the Qing force who fought in Tibet in the war against the Dzungars. It was said that the Sichuan commander Yue Zhongqi (a descendant of Yue Fei) entered Lhasa first when the 2,000 Green Standard soldiers and 1,000 Manchu soldiers of the "Sichuan route" seized Lhasa. According to Mark C. Elliott, after 1728 the Qing used Green Standard Army troops to man the garrison in Lhasa rather than Bannermen. According to Evelyn S. Rawski both Green Standard Army and Bannermen made up the Qing garrison in Tibet. According to Sabine Dabringhaus, Green Standard Chinese soldiers numbering more than 1,300 were stationed by the Qing in Tibet to support the 3,000-strong Tibetan army.

The Qing had made the region of Amdo and Kham into the province of Qinghai in 1724, and incorporated eastern Kham into neighbouring Chinese provinces in 1728. The Qing government sent a resident commissioner (amban) to Lhasa. Polhanas' son Gyurme Namgyal took over upon his father's death in 1747. The ambans became convinced that he was going to lead a rebellion, so they killed him. News of the incident leaked out and a riot broke out in the city, the mob avenged the regent's death by killing the ambans. The Dalai Lama stepped in and restored order in Lhasa. The Qianlong Emperor (Yongzheng's successor) sent Qing forces to execute Gyurme Namgyal's family and seven members of the group that killed the ambans. The Emperor re-organized the Tibetan government (Kashag) again, nominally restoring temporal power to the Dalai Lama, but in fact consolidating power in the hands of the (new) ambans.

==== Expansion of control over Tibet ====
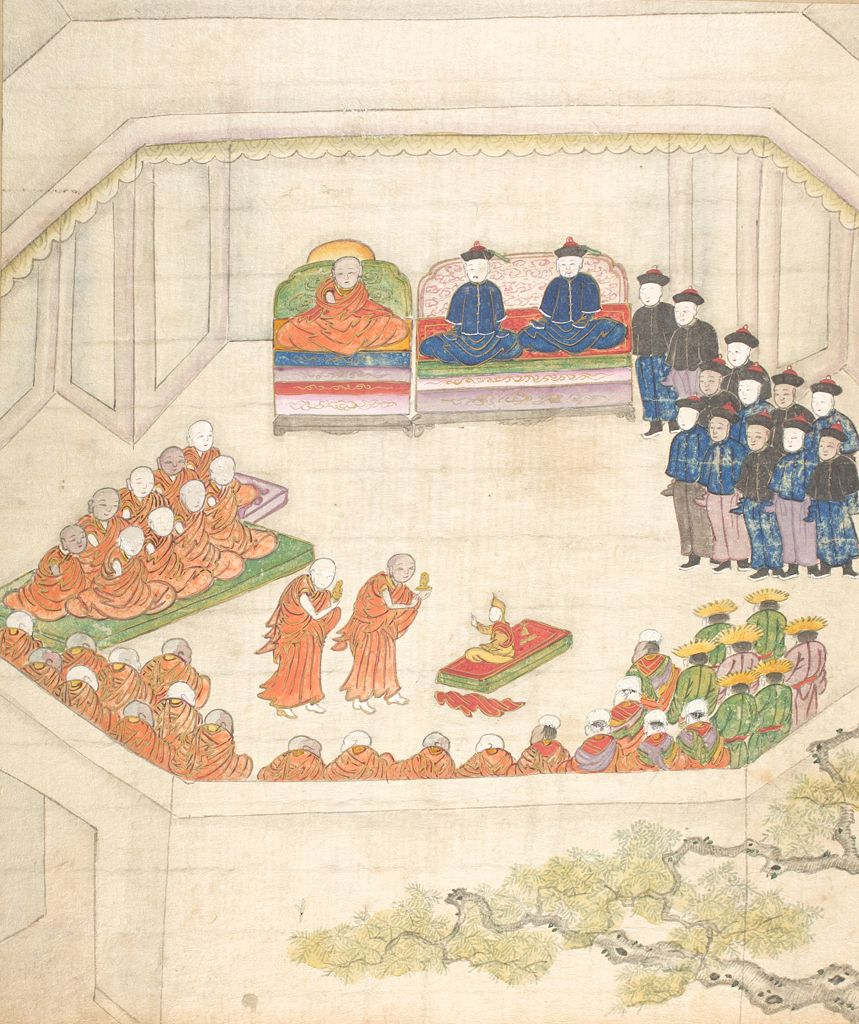
Induction of Lungtok Gyatso, 9th Dalai Lama, in the presence of Ambans around 1808

The defeat of the 1791 Nepalese invasion increased the Qing's control over Tibet. From that moment, all important matters were to be submitted to the ambans. It strengthened the powers of the ambans. The ambans were elevated above the Kashag and the regents in responsibility for Tibetan political affairs. The Dalai and Panchen Lamas were no longer allowed to petition the Qing Emperor directly but could only do so through the ambans. The ambans took control of Tibetan frontier defense and foreign affairs. The ambans were put in command of the Qing garrison and the Tibetan army (whose strength was set at 3,000 men). Trade was also restricted and travel could be undertaken only with documents issued by the ambans. The ambans were to review all judicial decisions. However, according to Warren Smith, these directives were either never fully implemented, or quickly discarded, as the Qing were more interested in a symbolic gesture of authority than actual sovereignty. In 1841, the Hindu Dogra dynasty attempted to establish their authority on Ü-Tsang but were defeated in the Sino-Sikh War (1841–1842).

In the mid-19th century, arriving with Amban Qishan, a community of Chinese troops from Sichuan who married Tibetan women settled down in the Lubu neighborhood of Lhasa, where their descendants established a community and assimilated into Tibetan culture. Hebalin was the location of where Chinese Muslim troops and their offspring lived, while Lubu was the place where Han Chinese troops and their offspring lived.

=== European influences in Tibet ===
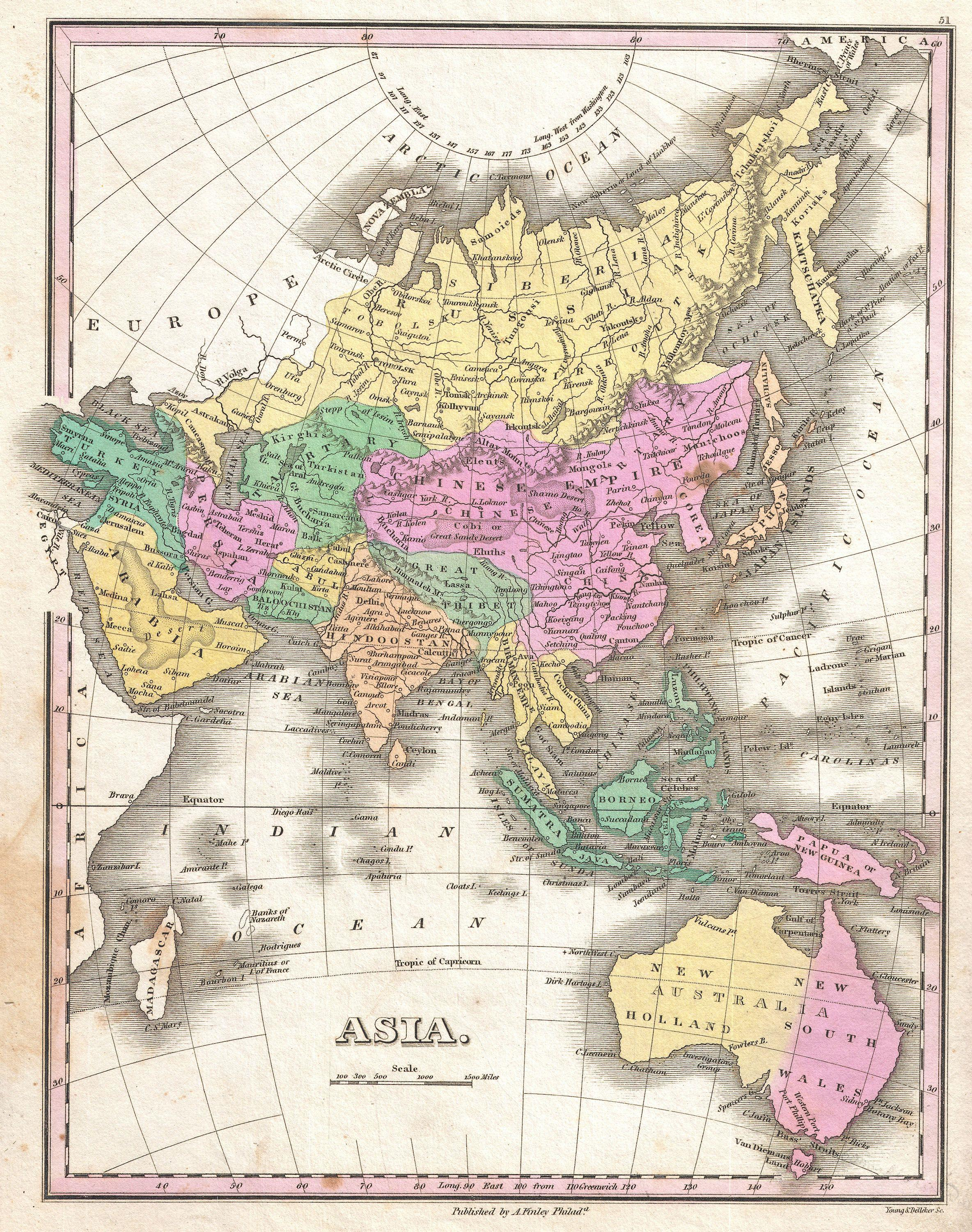
As of 1827, the entire Assam, Bhutan, Sikkim and Ladakh were part of Tibet and the Sino-Tibetan border were at the Jiang River with most present-day ethnic Tibetan Autonomous Prefectures part of then ethnic Han-Mongol dominated area. Bhutan and Sikkim later gains independence and Sikkim was subsequently incorporated into India in May. The entire Assam and Ladakh were merged into the British Raj.

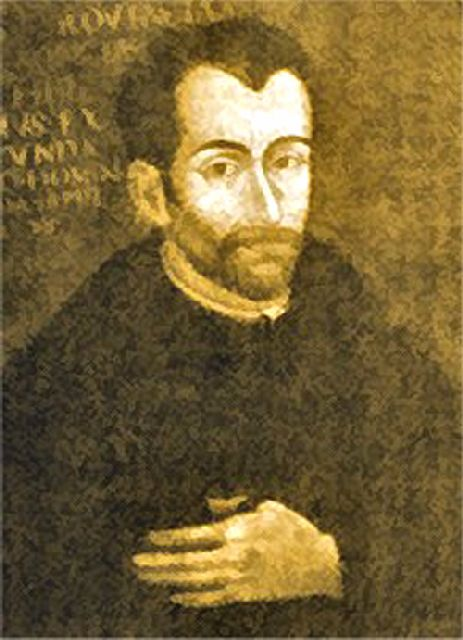
António de Andrade

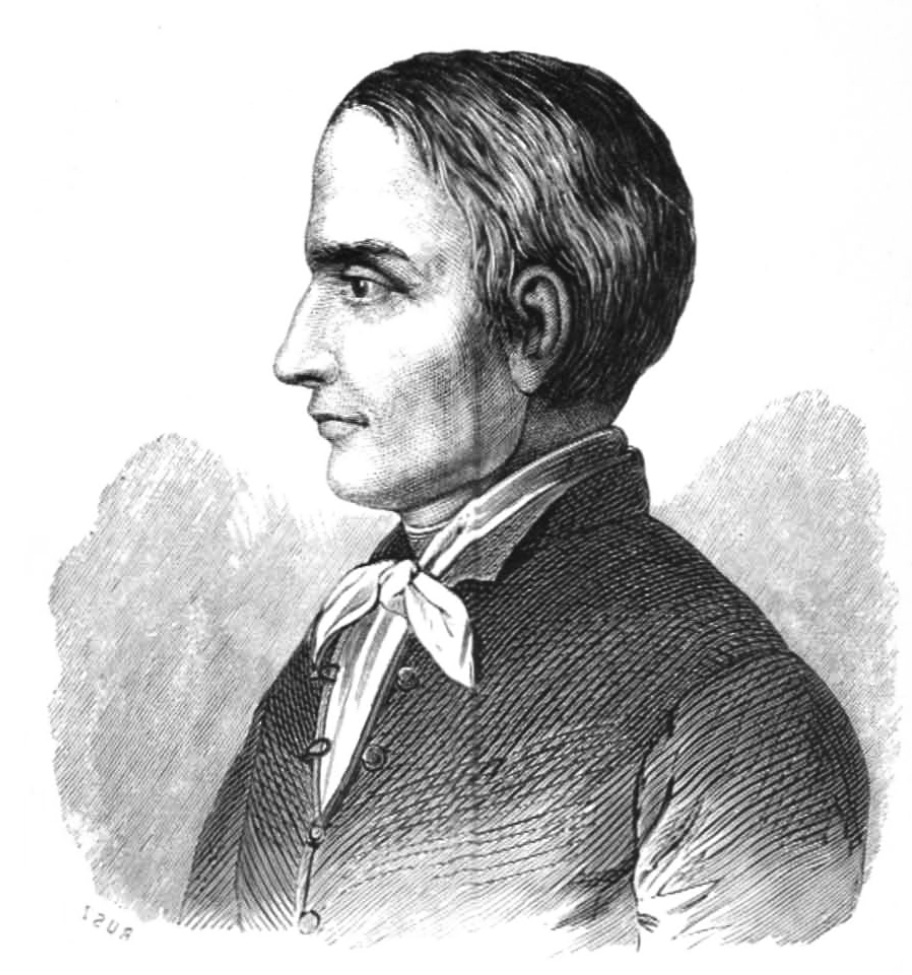
Sándor Kőrösi Csoma

The first Europeans to arrive in Tibet were Portuguese missionaries who first arrived in 1624 led by António de Andrade. They were welcomed by the Tibetans who allowed them to build a church. The 18th century brought more Jesuits and Capuchins from Europe. They gradually met opposition from Tibetan lamas who finally expelled them from Tibet in 1745. Other visitors included, in 1774 a Scottish nobleman, George Bogle, who came to Shigatse to investigate trade for the British East India Company, introducing the first potatoes into Tibet. After 1792 Tibet, under Chinese influence, closed its borders to Europeans and during the 19th century only 3 Westerners, the Englishman Thomas Manning and 2 French missionaries Huc and Gabet, reached Lhasa, although a number were able to travel in the Tibetan periphery.

During the 19th century the British Empire was encroaching from northern India into the Himalayas and Afghanistan and the Russian Empire of the tsars was expanding south into Central Asia. Each power became suspicious of intent in Tibet. But Tibet attracted the attention of many explorers. In 1840, Sándor Kőrösi Csoma arrived in Darjeeling, hoping that he would be able to trace the origin of the Magyar ethnic group, but died before he was able to enter Tibet. In 1865 Great Britain secretly began mapping Tibet. Trained Indian surveyor-spies disguised as pilgrims or traders, called pundits, counted their strides on their travels across Tibet and took readings at night. Nain Singh, the most famous, measured the longitude, latitude and altitude of Lhasa and traced the Yarlung Tsangpo River.

=== British expedition to Tibet ===
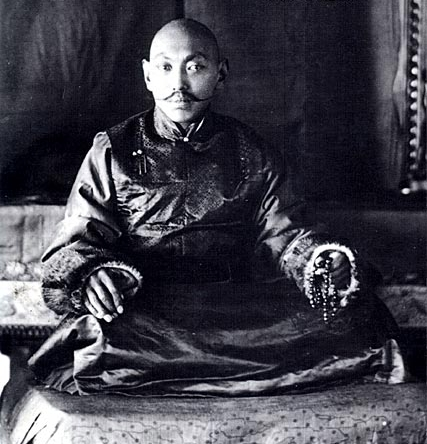
The 13th Dalai Lama in 1910

At the beginning of the 20th century the British and Russian Empires were competing for supremacy in Central Asia. Unable to establish diplomatic contacts with the Tibetan government, and concerned about reports of their dealings with Russia, in 1903–04, a British expedition led by Colonel Francis Younghusband was sent to Lhasa to force a trading agreement and to prevent Tibetans from establishing a relationship with the Russians. In response, the Qing foreign ministry asserted that China was sovereign over Tibet, the first clear statement of such a claim. Before the British expedition arrived in Lhasa, the 13th Dalai Lama fled to Outer Mongolia, and then went to Beijing in 1908.

The British expedition was one of the triggers for the 1905 Tibetan Rebellion at Batang monastery, when anti-foreign Tibetan lamas massacred French missionaries, Manchu and Han Qing officials, and Christian converts before Qing forces crushed the revolt.

The Anglo-Tibetan Treaty of Lhasa of 1904 was followed by the Sino-British treaty of 1906. Beijing agreed to pay London 2.5 million rupees which Lhasa was forced to agree upon in the Anglo-Tibetan treaty of 1904. In 1907, Britain and Russia agreed that in "conformity with the admitted principle of the suzerainty of China over Tibet" both nations "engage not to enter into negotiations with Tibet except through the intermediary of the Chinese Government."

The Qing government in Beijing then appointed Zhao Erfeng, the Governor of Xining, "Army Commander of Tibet" to reintegrate Tibet into China. He was sent in 1905 (though other sources say this occurred in 1908) on a punitive expedition. His troops destroyed a number of monasteries in Kham and Amdo, and a process of sinification of the region was begun. The Dalai Lama once again fled, this time to India, and was once again deposed by the Chinese. The situation was soon to change, however, as, after the fall of the Qing dynasty in October 1911, Zhao's soldiers mutinied and beheaded him. All remaining Qing forces left Tibet after the Xinhai Lhasa turmoil.

== De facto independence (1912–1951) ==
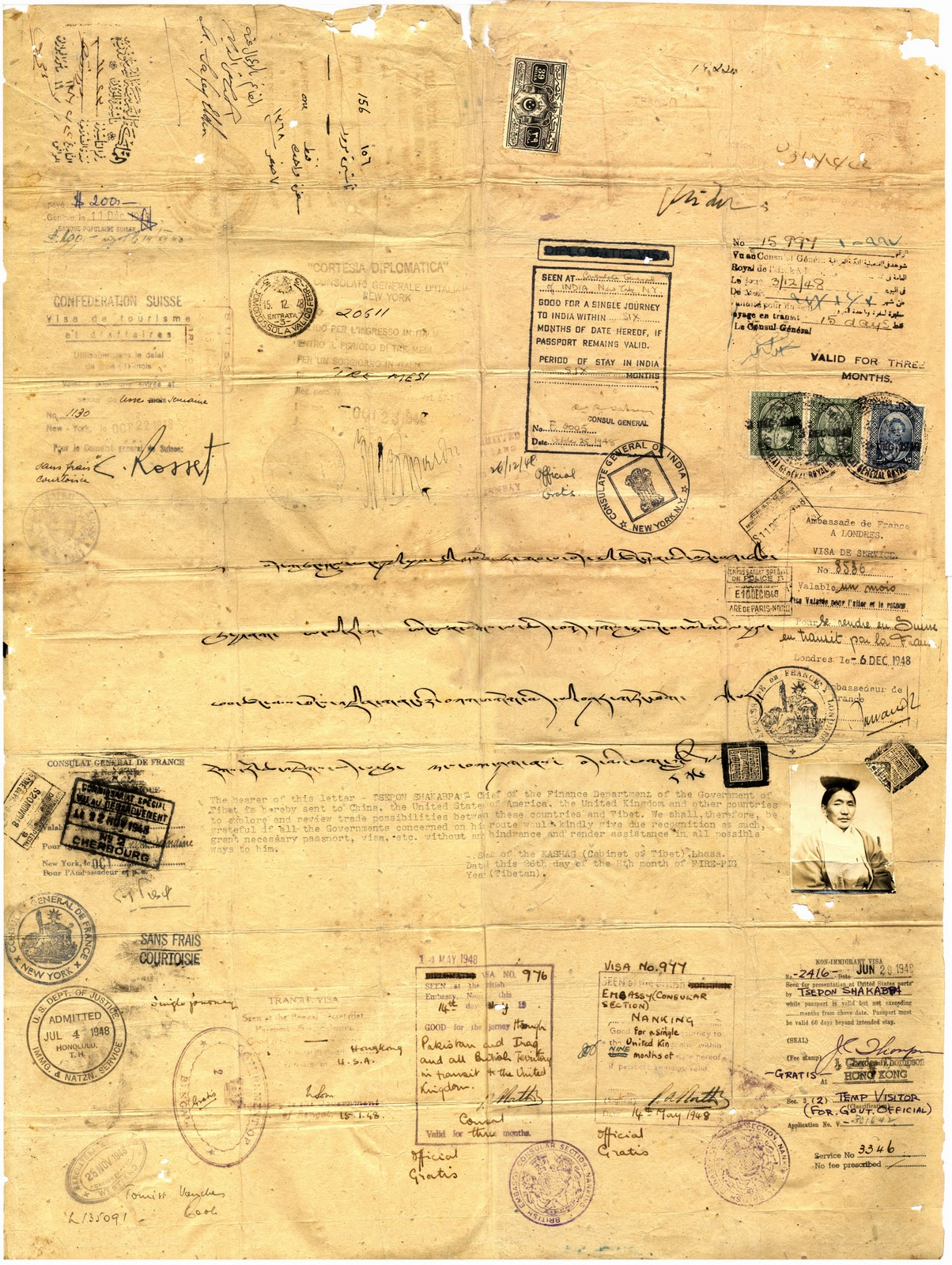
Tibetan passport 1947/1948 – issued to Tsepon Shakabpa, then Chief of the Finance Department of the Government of Tibet

The Dalai Lama returned to Tibet from India in July 1912 (after the fall of the Qing dynasty), and expelled the Amban and all Chinese troops. In 1913, the Dalai Lama issued a proclamation that stated that the relationship between the Chinese emperor and Tibet "had been that of patron and priest and had not been based on the subordination of one to the other." "We are a small, religious, and independent nation", the proclamation continued.

For the next thirty-six years, Tibet had de facto independence while China endured its Warlord era, civil war, and World War II. The Republic of China framed its laws as applicable in Tibet. Some Chinese sources argue that Tibet was part of China throughout this period. A book published in 1939 by a Swedish sinologist and linguist about the war in China placed Tibet as part of China. The Chinese government in the 1930s tried to claim superiority. The USA also recognised Tibet as a province of China during this time as seen in the documentary film Why We Fight #6 The Battle of China produced by the USA War Department in 1944. Some other authors argue that Tibet was also de jure independent after Tibet-Mongolia Treaty of 1913.

Tibet continued in 1913–1949 to have very limited contacts with the rest of the world, although British representatives were stationed in Gyantse, Yatung and Gartok (western Tibet) after the Younghusband Mission. These so-called "Trade Agents" were in effect diplomatic representatives of the British Government of India and in 1936–37 the British also established a permanent mission in Lhasa. This was in response to a Chinese "condolence mission' sent to the Tibetan capital after the demise of the 13th Dalai Lama which remained in Lhasa as, in effect, a Republican Chinese diplomatic post. After 1947 the British mission was transferred to the newly independent Indian government control although the last British representative, Hugh Richardson remained in Lhasa until 1950 serving the Indian government. The British, like the Chinese, encouraged the Tibetans to keep foreigners out of Tibet and no foreigners visited Lhasa between the departure of the Younghusband mission in 1904 and the arrival of a telegraph officer in 1920. Just over 90 European and Japanese visited Lhasa during the years 1920–1950, most of whom were British diplomatic personnel. Very few governments did anything resembling a normal diplomatic recognition of Tibet. In 1914 the Tibetan government signed the Simla Accord with Britain, ceding the several small areas on the southern side of the Himalayan watershed to British India. The Chinese government denounced the agreement as illegal.

In 1932, the National Revolutionary Army, composed of Muslim and Han soldiers, led by Ma Bufang and Liu Wenhui defeated the Tibetan army in the Sino-Tibetan War when the 13th Dalai Lama tried to seize territory in Qinghai and Xikang. It was also reported that the central government of China encouraged the attack, hoping to solve the "Tibet situation", because the Japanese had just seized Manchuria. They warned the Tibetans not to dare cross the Jinsha river again. A truce was signed, ending the fighting. The Dalai Lama had cabled the British in India for help when his armies were defeated, and started demoting his Generals who had surrendered.

== People's Republic of China's rule (1950–present) ==
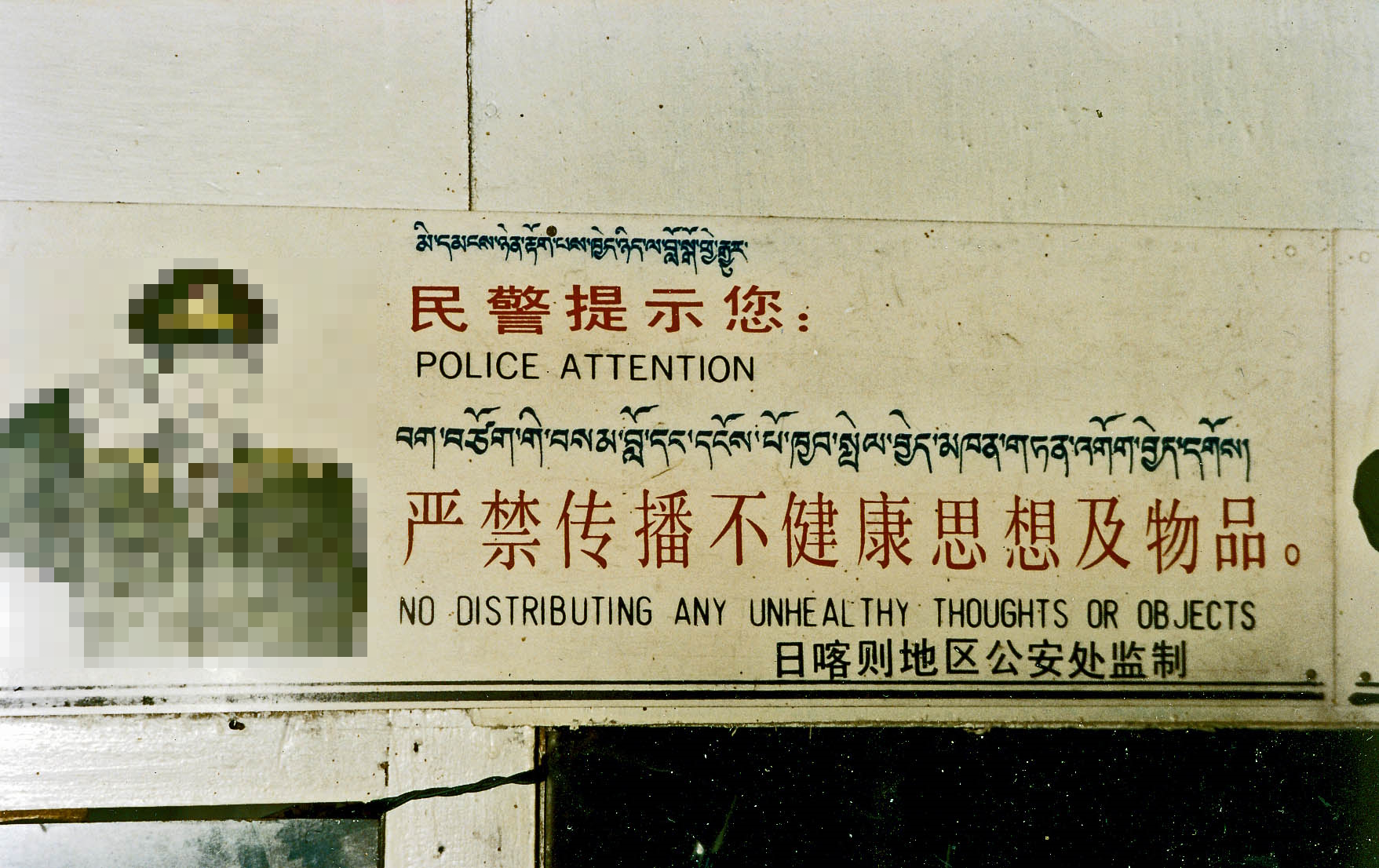
"Police Attention: No distributing any unhealthy thoughts or objects." A trilingual (Tibetan–Chinese–English) sign above the entrance to a small cafe in Nyalam, Tibet, 1993.

In 1949, seeing that the Chinese Communists, with the decisive support from Joseph Stalin, were gaining control of China, the Kashag expelled all Chinese who were connected with the Chinese government, triggering protests by both the Kuomintang and the Communists. The People's Republic of China (PRC), founded in October 1949 by the victorious Communists under the leadership of Mao Zedong, lost little time in asserting a new Chinese presence in Tibet. In October 1950, the People's Liberation Army entered the Tibetan area of Chamdo, defeating sporadic resistance from the Tibetan army. In 1951, Tibetan representatives participated in negotiations in Beijing with the Chinese government. This resulted in a Seventeen Point Agreement which formalized China's sovereignty over Tibet, the agreement was ratified by the Dalai Lama in 1959, but it was repudiated by the present Tibetan government-in-exile in 2021.

From the beginning, it was obvious that incorporating Tibet into Communist China would bring two opposite social systems face-to-face. In Tibet, however, the Chinese Communists opted not to place social reform as an immediate priority. On the contrary, from 1951 to 1959, traditional Tibetan society with its lords and manorial estates continued to function unchanged. Despite the presence of twenty thousand Chinese soldiers in Central Tibet, the Dalai Lama's government was permitted to maintain important symbols from its de facto independence period.

The Communists quickly abolished slavery and serfdom in their traditional forms. They also claim to have reduced taxes, unemployment, and beggary, and to have started work projects. They established secular schools, thereby breaking the educational monopoly of the monasteries, and they constructed running water and electrical systems in Lhasa.

The Tibetan region of Eastern Kham, previously Xikang province, was incorporated in the province of Sichuan. Western Kham was put under the Chamdo Military Committee. In these areas, land reform was implemented. This involved communist agitators designating "landlords"—sometimes arbitrarily chosen—for public humiliation in thamzing (Wylie: ‘thab-‘dzing, Lhasa dialect: [tʰʌ́msiŋ]) or "Struggle Sessions", torture, maiming, and even death.

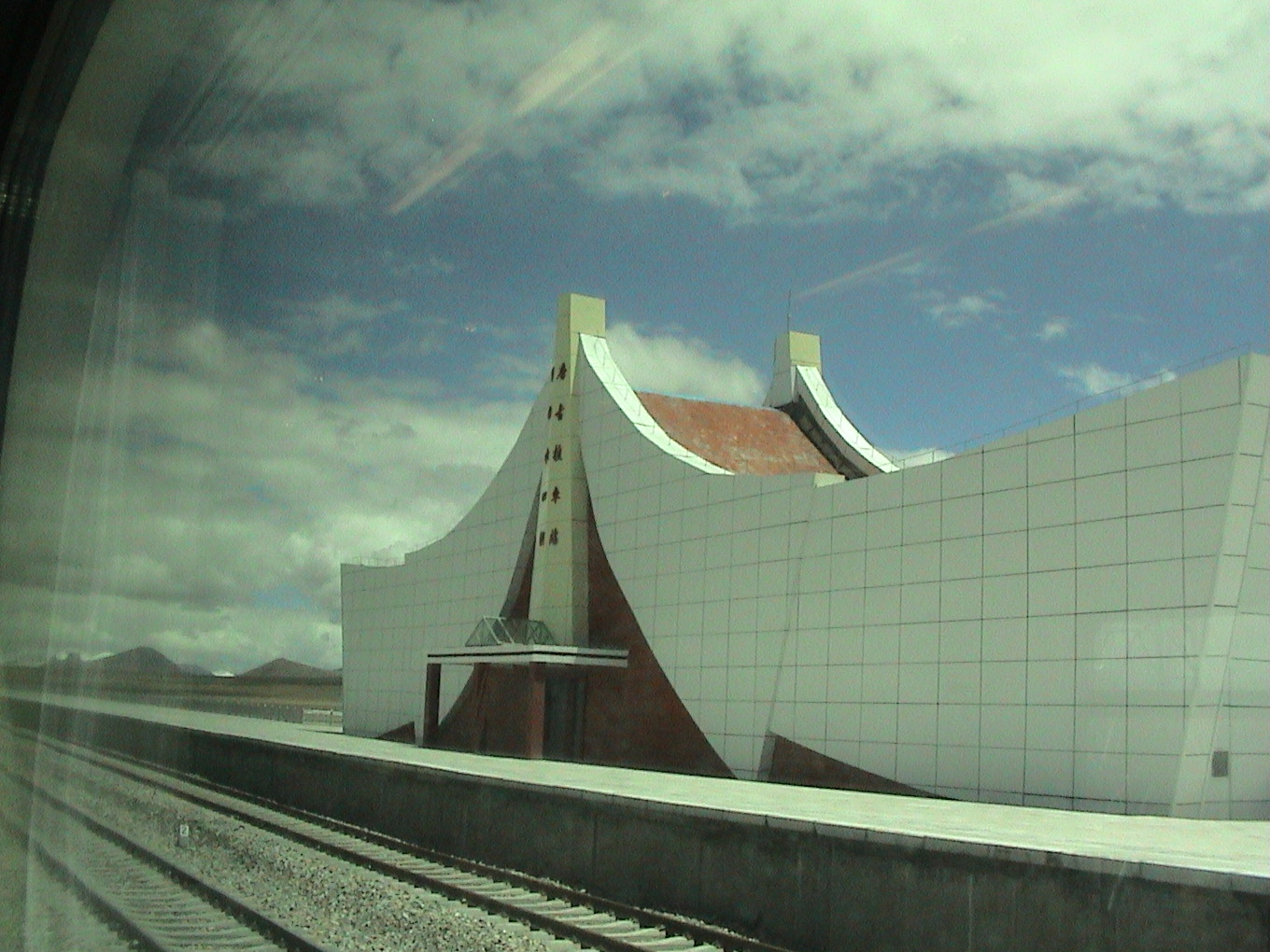
Tanggula railway station, located at 5,068 m (16,627 ft), is the highest station in the world.

By 1956 there was unrest in eastern Kham and Amdo, where land reform had been implemented in full. These rebellions eventually spread into western Kham and Ü-Tsang.

In 1956–57, armed Tibetan guerrillas ambushed convoys of the Chinese Peoples Liberation Army. The uprising received extensive assistance from the U.S. Central Intelligence Agency (CIA), including military training, support camps in Nepal, and several airlifts. Meanwhile, in the United States, the American Society for a Free Asia, a CIA-financed front, energetically publicized the cause of Tibetan resistance, with the Dalai Lama's eldest brother, Thubten Norbu, playing an active role in that organization. The Dalai Lama's second-eldest brother, Gyalo Thondup, established an intelligence operation with the CIA as early as 1951. He later upgraded it into a CIA-trained guerrilla unit whose recruits parachuted back into Tibet.

Many Tibetan commandos and agents whom the CIA dropped into the country were chiefs of aristocratic clans or the sons of chiefs. Ninety percent of them were never heard from again, according to a report from the CIA itself, meaning they were most likely captured and killed. Ginsburg and Mathos reached the conclusion, that "As far as can be ascertained, the great bulk of the common people of Lhasa and of the adjoining countryside failed to join in the fighting against the Chinese both when it first began and as it progressed." According to other data, many thousands of common Tibetans participated in the rebellion. Declassified Soviet archives provides data that Chinese communists, who received a great assistance in military equipment from the USSR, broadly used Soviet aircraft for bombing monasteries and other punitive operations in Tibet.

In 1959, China's military crackdown on rebels in Kham and Amdo led to the "Lhasa Uprising." Full-scale resistance spread throughout Tibet. Fearing capture of the Dalai Lama, unarmed Tibetans surrounded his residence, and the Dalai Lama fled to India.

The period from 1959 to 1962 was marked by extensive starvation during the Great Chinese Famine brought about by drought and by the Chinese policies of the Great Leap Forward which affected all of China and not only Tibet. The Tenth Panchen Lama was a keen observer of Tibet during this period and penned the 70,000 Character Petition to detail the sufferings of the Tibetans and sent it to Zhou Enlai in May 1962.

In 1962, China and India fought a brief war over the disputed Aksai Chin region. Although China won the war, Chinese troops withdrew north of the McMahon Line.

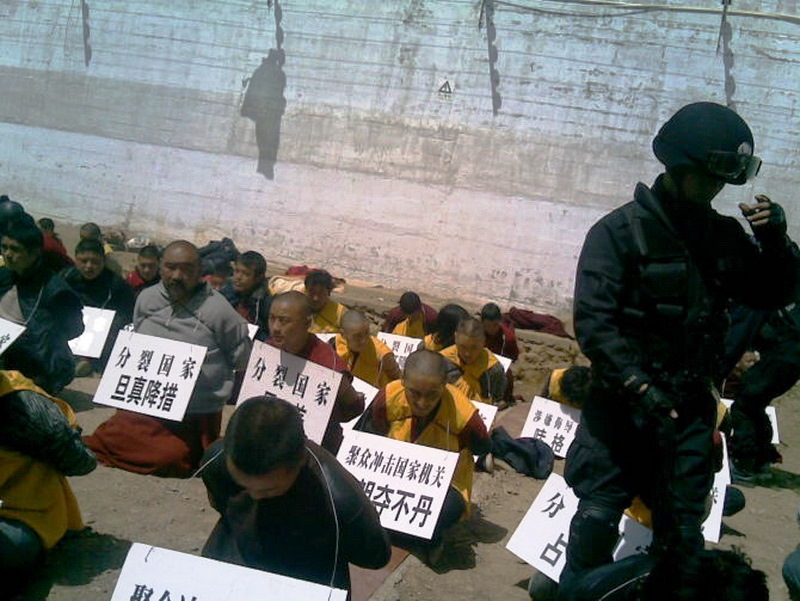
Military crackdown in Ngaba after 2008 Tibetan unrest

In 1965, the area that had been under the control of the Dalai Lama's government from the 1910s to 1959 (Ü-Tsang and western Kham) was renamed the Tibet Autonomous Region (TAR). Autonomy provided that the head of government would be an ethnic Tibetan; however, actual power in the TAR is held by the First Secretary of the Tibet Autonomous Regional Committee of the Chinese Communist Party, who has never been a Tibetan. The role of ethnic Tibetans in the higher levels of the TAR Communist Party remains very limited.

The destruction of most of Tibet's more than 6,000 monasteries occurred between 1959 and 1961 by the Chinese Communist Party. During the mid-1960s, the monastic estates were broken up and secular education introduced. During the Cultural Revolution. Red Guards inflicted a campaign of organized vandalism against cultural sites in the entire PRC, including Tibet's Buddhist heritage.

When General Secretary Hu Yaobang visited Tibet in 1980 and 1982, he disagreed with what he viewed as heavy-handedness. Hu reduced the number of Han party cadre, and relaxed social controls.

In 1989, the Panchen Lama died of a massive heart attack at the age of 50.

The PRC continues to portray its rule over Tibet as an unalloyed improvement, but as some foreign governments continue to make protests about aspects of PRC rule in Tibet as groups such as Human Rights Watch report alleged human rights violations. Most governments, however, recognize the PRC's sovereignty over Tibet today, and none have recognized the Government of Tibet in Exile in India.

Riots flared up again in 2008. Many ethnic Hans and Huis were attacked in the riot, their shops vandalized or burned. The Chinese government reacted swiftly, imposing curfews and strictly limiting access to Tibetan areas. The international response was likewise immediate and robust, with some leaders condemning the crackdown and large protests and some in support of China's actions.

In 2018, German car manufacturer Mercedes-Benz reverted an advertisement and apologized for 'hurting feelings' of Chinese people by quoting the Dalai Lama.

Since 2009, at least 160 Tibetans, including monks, nuns, and ordinary people, have self-immolated to protest Chinese policies in Tibet.

=== Tibetans in exile ===
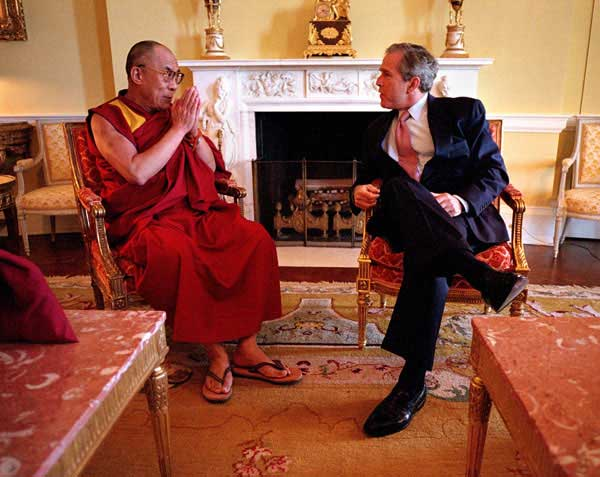
Fourteenth Dalai Lama with George W. Bush in the White House on May 23, 2001

Following the Lhasa uprising and the Dalai Lama's flight from Tibet in 1959, the government of India accepted the Tibetan refugees. India designated land for the refugees in the mountainous region of Dharamsala, India, where the Dalai Lama and the Tibetan government-in-exile are now based.

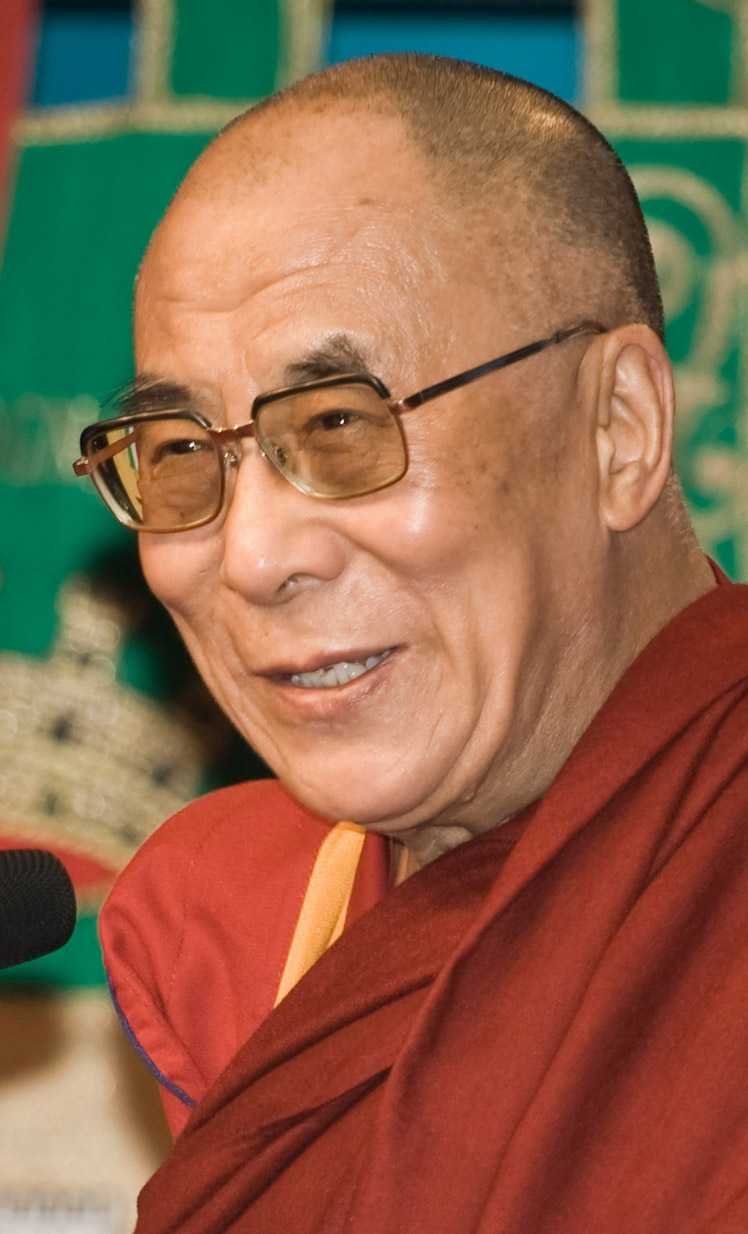
The 14th Dalai Lama, Tenzin Gyatso

The plight of the Tibetan refugees garnered international attention when the Dalai Lama, spiritual and religious leader of the Tibetan government in exile, won the Nobel Peace Prize in 1989. The Dalai Lama was awarded the Nobel Prize on the basis of his unswerving commitment to peaceful protest against the Chinese occupation of Tibet. He is highly regarded as a result and has since been received by government leaders throughout the world. Among the most recent ceremonies and awards, he was given the Congressional Gold Medal by President Bush in 2007, and in 2006 he was one of only seven people to ever receive an honorary Canadian citizenship (see Honorary Canadian citizenship). The PRC consistently protests each official contact with the exiled Tibetan leader.

The community of Tibetans in exile established in Dharamshala and Bylakuppe near Mysore in Karnataka, South India, has expanded since 1959. Tibetans have duplicated Tibetan monasteries in India and these now house tens of thousands of monks. They have also created Tibetan schools and hospitals, and founded the Library of Tibetan Works and Archives—all aimed at continuing Tibetan tradition and culture. Tibetan festivals such as Lama dances, celebration of Losar (the Tibetan New Year), and the Monlam Prayer Festival, continue in exile.

In 2006, Tenzin Gyatso, the 14th Dalai Lama declared that "Tibet wants autonomy, not independence." However, the Chinese distrust him, believing that he has not really given up the quest for Tibetan independence.

Talks between representatives of the Dalai Lama and the Chinese government began again in May, 2008 with little result.

== See also ==
- 1959 Tibetan uprising
- 1987–1989 Tibetan unrest
- 2008 Tibetan unrest
- History of Central Asia
- History of India
- History of Ladakh
- History of Tibetan Buddhism
- List of rulers of Tibet
- Patron and priest relationship
- Pha Trelgen Changchup Sempa
- Protests and uprisings in Tibet since 1950
- Self-immolation protests by Tibetans in China since 2009
- Sinicization of Tibet
- Tibet
