= Khams Military Commission =

In 1372, Khams paid allegiance to Ming dynasty, Khamas Guard was set a year later. It was reformed to a Military Commission (Chinese:朵甘行都指挥使司) in 1374. It was abandoned when the Tumed Mongols expanded in the period of Wanli.

== See also ==
- U-Tsang Military Commission
