= U-Tsang Military Commission =

Title during the Ming dynasty

The U-Tsang Military Commission (Chinese: 乌斯藏都指挥使司) was a title in Ü-Tsang’s Jimi system established in 1372, during the Ming dynasty. It was matched in eastern Tibet by the Do-kham Regional Military Commission. In the fifth year of the Hongwu reign (1372), Wusi Zang was annexed. On February 23rd, 1373, in the second month of the sixth year of the Hongwu reign, the Wusi Tibetan Guard Command and the Duogan Guard Command were established, both under the jurisdiction of the Xi'an Xingsi. On July 16th, 1374 (the 16th day of the seventh year of the Hongwu reign), the Xi'an Garrison Command was in charge of the Hezhou, Duogan, and Wusi Zang three guards, and the Duogan and Wusi Zang two guards were promoted to the Duogan and Wusi Zang Garrison Command. In the twelfth month of the seventh year of the Hongwu reign (January 3, 1375), the Wushizang Commander's Office and the Duogan Commander's Office were established. On the tenth day of the first lunar month in the eighth year of the Hongwu reign (February 10, 1375), the Elisi military and civilian marshal's office (俄力思军民元帅府), the Bamu Zhuba Wanhu office, and the Wusi Canglongda Qianhu office were established. After replacing the Parmuzhuba regime in 1446, Renbangba continued to use the title, forming a new local political system. In actual governance, during the Zhengtong and Chenghua periods, the Ming court still conferred titles on the actual rulers of the Wusi Zang region (such as the Renbangba regime), and the relationship between the two parties' titles - tribute relations and horse taxes - continued between the two sides in terms of titles and tribute continued.

== See also ==
- Khams Military Commission
