= 3rd Dalai Lama =

Spiritual leader of Tibet from 1578 to 1588

3rd Dalai Lama, Sonam Gyatso
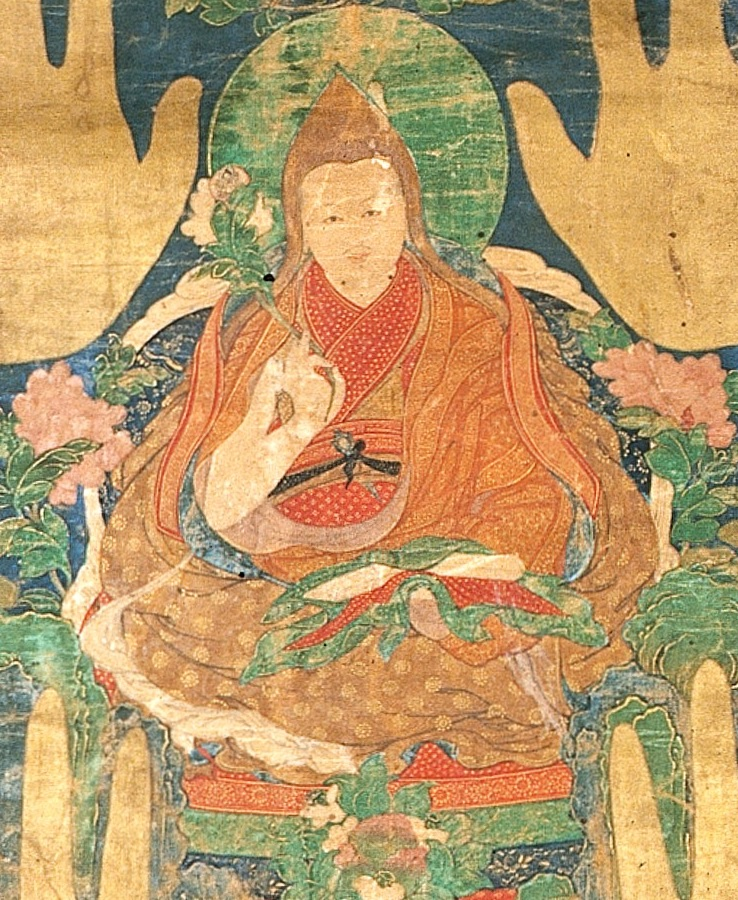
- Title: 3rd Dalai Lama

Personal life
- Born: 1543 Tolung, Ü-Tsang, Tibet
- Died: 1588 (aged 44–45) Northern Yuan

Religious life
- Religion: Buddhism

Senior posting
- Period in office: 1578–1588
- Predecessor: Gendun Gyatso
- Successor: Yonten Gyatso

Chinese name
- Chinese: 索南嘉措
Transcriptions

Tibetan name
- Tibetan: བསོད་ནམས་རྒྱ་མཚོ་
Transcriptions
- Wylie: bsod nams rgya mtsho

The 3rd Dalai Lama, Sonam Gyatso (Tibetan: བསོད་ནམས་རྒྱ་མཚོ་, Wylie: Bsod Nams Rgya Mtsho) (1543–1588), was the first in the tulku lineage to be entitled formally as the Dalai Lama. In 1578 Altan Khan presented the spiritual title of Dalai Lama, in honor of Sonam Gyatso's profound teachings conferred in Mongolia, which soon became a Tibetan Buddhist country. He founded Kumbum Monastery, Lithang Monastery, and Namgyal Monastery. The spiritual title was retrospectively given to his two tulku lineage predecessors, the 1st Dalai Lama and the 2nd Dalai Lama.

Sonam Gyatso was born near Lhasa in 1543 and was recognised as the reincarnation of Gendun Gyatso and subsequently enthroned at Drepung Monastery by Panchen Sonam Dragpa, who became his tutor. Panchen Sonam Dragpa was the 15th Ganden Tripa and his texts still serve as the core curriculum for many Gelug monasteries. The 3rd Dalai Lama studied at Drepung Monastery and became its abbot. His reputation spread quickly and the monks at Sera Monastery also recognised him as their abbot.

According to Sumpa Khenpo, the great Gelug scholar, he also studied Nyingma tantric doctrines.

When one of Tibet's regional kings, who had been supported by the Kagyu school, died in 1564, Sonam Gyatso presided over his funeral. His political power, and that of the Gelug school, grew in dominance in Tibet by the 1570s.

== Origin of the title "Dalai Lama" ==
The title "Dalai Lama" was first bestowed by Altan Khan upon Sonam Gyatso in 1578, when Altan Khan was a Chinese Prince of Shunyi during the Ming Dynasty (Wang, 顺义王) of China. The spiritual title of "Dalai Lama" was derived from the Mongolian Dalai-yin qan (or Dalaiin khan) one.

Since the time of Genghis Khan, only people who were of his royal lineage were allowed to rule Mongolia. This frustrated many would-be rulers who were not of this line. Altan Khan was of the royal line, but within a junior branch, and perceived that through the Buddhist faith he could gain legitimacy by claiming to be a reincarnation of Kublai Khan.

Altan Khan chose the Gelug order of Tibetan Buddhism (founded by Tsongkhapa, 1357–1419). In 1577 he invited the leader of this order, Sonam Gyatsho, to come to Mongolia and teach his people. At some point, Sonam Gyatso proclaimed Altan Khan to be the reincarnation of Kublai Khan.

In response to Sonam Gyatso's teachings, Altan Khan conferred the title of Dalai Lama on Sonam Gyatso. Altan Khan posthumously awarded the title to his two predecessors, making Sonam Gyatso the 3rd Dalai Lama.

== Altan Khan and the conversion of Mongolia ==
Sonam Gyatso, a monk of the Gelug (Yellow Hat) school of Tibetan Buddhism, was in a position of finding a foreign patron for the Gelug school. He established a cho-yon or priest and patron relationship with Altan Khan, ruler of numerous Mongol tribes and a prince of Ming China. At the time, the Mongolians were not united under a single religion. Their practices instead consisted of superstition, indigenous religious conceptions, and shamanism. However, Sonam Gyatso was against shamanism and its idols.

Altan Khan first invited Sonam Gyatso to Tümed in 1569, but apparently the Dalai Lama refused to go and sent a disciple, who reported back to the Dalai Lama about the great opportunity to spread Buddhist teachings throughout Mongolia. In 1573 Altan Khan took some Tibetan Buddhist monks prisoner.

Altan Khan invited Sonam Gyatso to Mongolia again and embraced Tibetan Buddhism. After some hesitation, with followers begging him not to go, Sonam Gyatso's party set out and was met at Ahrik Karpatang in Mongolia where a specially prepared camp had been set up to receive them. Thousands of animals were given to him as offerings and five hundred horsemen had been sent to escort him to Altan Khan's court. When they arrived there, they were greeted by over ten thousand people, including Altan Khan dressed in a white robe to symbolize his devotion to the Dharma.

Some sources say this first meeting between Sonam Gyatso and Altan Khan took place in Amdo near Lake Kokonor, which was heavily populated by Mongolian peoples.

While Altan Khan bestowed the title Dalai on Sonam Gyatso, the latter gave the title of Brahma, the king of religion, to Altan Khan.

Altan Khan had Thegchen Chonkhor, Mongolia's first monastery, built, and a massive program of translating Tibetan texts into Mongolian was commenced. Within 50 years most Mongolians had become Buddhist, with tens of thousands of monks who were members of the Gelug school, loyal to the Dalai Lama.

Sonam Gyatso's message was that the time had come for Mongolia to embrace Buddhism, that from that time on there should be no more animal sacrifices, the images of the old gods were to be destroyed, there must be no taking of life, animal or human, military action must be given up and the immolation of women on the funeral pyres of their husbands must be abolished. He also secured an edict abolishing the Mongolian custom of blood-sacrifices. "These and many other such laws were set forth by Gyalwa Sonam Gyatso and were instituted by Altan Khan."

The 3rd Dalai Lama publicly announced that he was a reincarnation of Drogön Chögyal Phagpa, while Altan Khan was a reincarnation of Kublai Khan, and that they had come together again to cooperate in propagating Buddhism.

The alliance with the Mongolians would later prove instrumental in establishing the Gelug school as the spiritual and political leaders of Tibet during the reign of the Great Fifth Dalai Lama.

Altan Khan died in 1582, only four years after meeting with the 3rd Dalai Lama. According to legend, Abtai Sain Khan was given a Buddha relic by the 3rd Dalai Lama to help in the spread of Buddhism.

Altan Khan was succeeded by his son Sengge Düüreng who continued to diligently support Buddhism, and two years later the 3rd Dalai Lama made another visit to Mongolia. On his way, he founded the monastery of Kumbum at the birthplace of the great teacher and reformer, Je Tsongkhapa.

Gyalwa Sonam Gyatso had also founded Lithang monastery in Eastern Tibet, as well as the small monastery Phende Lekshe Ling in either 1564 or 1565, which became known as Namgyal Monastery in 1571, the personal monastery of all the subsequent Dalai Lamas. By 1585, he was back in Mongolia and converted more Mongolian princes and their tribes.

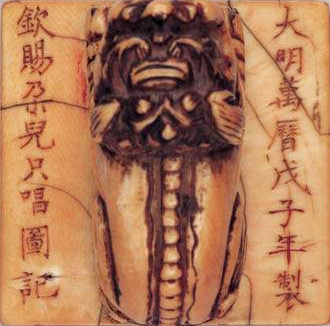
Duǒ Er Zhǐ Chàng, seal of authority

The Dalai Lama was again invited to meet the Ming emperor, and this time he accepted but fell ill and died in 1588, at the age of 45,) in Mongolia while returning to Tibet.

Altan Khan's great-grandson, Yonten Gyatso, was identified as the 4th Dalai Lama.

"To others give the victory and the spoils; The loss and defeat, take upon oneself" — Sonam Gyatso.

== Bibliography ==
- Essence of Refined Gold by the Third Dalai Lama: with related texts by the Second and Seventh Dalai Lamas. (1978) Translated by Glenn H. Mullin. Tushita Books, Dharamsala, H.P., India.
- Schwieger, Peter (2014). The Dalai Lama and the Emperor of China: a political history of the Tibetan institution of reincarnation. New York: Columbia University Press. ISBN 978-0-231-53860-2. OCLC 905914446.

Buddhist titles
Preceded by Gendun Gyatso	Dalai Lama; 1578–1588	Succeeded by Yonten Gyatso
