= 4th Dalai Lama =

Spiritual leader of Tibet from 1601 to 1616

Yonten
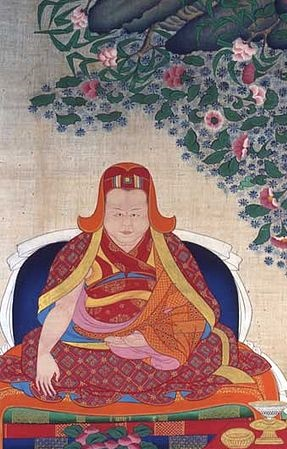
- Title: 4th Dalai Lama

Personal life
- Born: 1589 Northern Yuan
- Died: 1617 (aged 27–28) Tibet

Religious life
- Religion: Tibetan Buddhism

Senior posting
- Period in office: 1601–1617
- Predecessor: Sonam Gyatso
- Successor: Ngawang Lobsang Gyatso

Tibetan name
- Tibetan: ཡོན་ཏན་རྒྱ་མཚོ་
Transcriptions
- Wylie: yon tan rgya mtsho

Yonten Gyatso, (Tibetan: ཡོན་ཏན་རྒྱ་མཚོ་, Wylie: yon tan rgya mtsho) (1589–1617), was the 4th Dalai Lama, born in Tümed on the 30th day of the 12th month of the Earth Ox Year of the Tibetan calendar. Other sources, however, say he was born in the 1st month of the Earth Ox Year.

As the son of the Khan of the Chokur tribe, Tsultrim Choeje, and great-grandson of Altan Khan of the Tümed Mongols and his second wife PhaKhen Nula, Yonten Gyatso was a Mongol, making him the only non-Tibetan to be recognized as Dalai Lama other than the 6th Dalai Lama, who was a Monpa—but Monpas can be seen either as a Tibetan subgroup or a closely related people.

== Biography ==
The Nechung, state oracle of Tibet, and Lamo Tsangpa, another oracle, had both predicted the next reincarnation would be born in Mongolia. About this time, the chief attendant of the Third Dalai Lama, Tsultrim Gyatso, sent a letter informing the authorities in Tibet that the reincarnation had been born and details of some of the wonders accompanying his birth.

"He was recognized by a delegation from his Drêpung monastery and the princes of Ü, which had gone to Kweisui (Köke Qoto, Inner Mongolia) to meet him 1601."

Yonten Gyatso left for Tibet in 1599 when he was already ten years old, with his father, Tibetan monks and officials, and a thousand Mongol cavalry. They arrived in 1603 after stopping at all the major monasteries on the route.

When he reached Lhasa he was enthroned as the Fourth Dalai Lama and initiated by Sangen Rinchen, the principal holder of Tsonkapa's lineage and ex-abbot of Gaden monastery.

He began studies at Drepung Monastery, where he was a student of the Fourth Panchen Lama Lobsang Chökyi Gyaltsen, and in 1614 he received the full ordination of a monk from him.

Yonten Gyatso became the abbot of Drepung and, later, Sera monasteries.

Many Tibetans did not recognize him and there were several attempts to retake power from him, supported by the Kagyupa order. In 1605 one of the princes supporting the Kagyu invaded Lhasa and drove the Mongol cavalrymen out. When he was twenty-one warriors attacked Drepung monastery and Yonten Gyatso had to flee.

In 1616 he made a retreat in the caves above Sangyib Hot Springs, famous for the footprint Padmasambhava left there on the cliff face when he empowered the site in the 8th century CE.

He died under suspicious circumstances (some say he was poisoned – but evidence is lacking) in the 12th month of the Fire Dragon Year (January 1617) at the age of 27.

His chief attendant was Sonam Rapten (Sonam Choephel), who later discovered "the Chong-Gya boy" to be the Fifth Dalai Lama and who was the regent of the fifth Dalai Lama, the Desi.

== Bibliography ==
- Mullin, Glenn H. (2001). The Fourteen Dalai Lamas: A Sacred Legacy of Reincarnation, Clear Light Publishers. Santa Fe, New Mexico. ISBN 1-57416-092-3.
- Shakabpa, Tsepon W.D. (2010). One Hundred Thousand Moons. An Advanced Political History of Tibet (2 vols). Leiden (Netherlands), Boston (USA): Brill's Tibetan Studies Library. ISBN 9789004177321.
- Stein, R. A. (1972). Tibetan Civilization, Stanford University Press. ISBN 0-8047-0806-1 (cloth); ISBN 0-8047-0901-7 (paper).
- Thubten Samphel and Tendar (2004). The Dalai Lamas of Tibet. Roli & Janssen, New Delhi. ISBN 81-7436-085-9.

Buddhist titles
Preceded by Sonam Gyatso	Dalai Lama; 1601–1617	Succeeded by Ngawang Lobsang Gyatso
