= Catuṣkoṭi =

Fourfold logical system in Indian philosophy

Catuṣkoṭi (Sanskrit; Devanagari: चतुष्कोटि, Tibetan: མུ་བཞི, Wylie: mu bzhi, Sinhalese:චතුස්කෝටිකය) refers to logical argument(s) of a 'suite of four discrete functions' or 'an indivisible quaternity' that has multiple applications and has been important in the Indian logic and the Buddhist logico-epistemological traditions, particularly those of the Madhyamaka school.

In particular, the catuṣkoṭi is a "four-cornered" system of argumentation that involves the systematic examination of each of the 4 possibilities of a proposition, P :

1. P ; that is being.
2. not P ; that is not being.
3. P and not P ; that is being and that is not being.
4. not (P or not P); that is neither not being nor is that being.

These four statements hold the following properties: (1) each alternative is mutually exclusive (that is, one of, but no more than one of, the four statements is true) and (2) that all the alternatives are together exhaustive (that is, at least one of them must necessarily be true). This system of logic not only provides a novel method of classifying propositions into logical alternatives, but also because it does so in such a manner that the alternatives are not dependent on the number of truth-values assumed in the system of logic.

An example of a Catuṣkoṭi using the arbitrary proposition, "Animals understand love" as P would be:

1. Animals understand love
2. Animals do not understand love
3. Animals both do and do not understand love
4. Animals neither do nor do not understand love

== Origins ==
The catuṣkoṭi probably originated in an earlier Indian sceptical tradition rather than in Buddhism. Its similarity to Pyrrho’s fourfold antinomies suggests that both Pyrrho and Buddhism were influenced by this earlier Indian scepticism. The method was later prominently used in Mādhyamika Buddhism.

== History ==
=== Nasadiya Sukta ===
Statements similar to the tetra lemma seems to appear in the Nasadiya Sukta (famous creation hymn), trying to inquire on the question of creation but was not used as a significant tool of logic before Buddhism.

=== Early Buddhism ===
Śākyamuni, as remembered by Ānanda and codified in the Brahmajala Sutta 2.27, when expounding the sixteenth wrong view, or the fourth wrong view of the 'Eel-Wrigglers' (Pali: amarā-vikheppikā), the non-committal equivocators who adhered to Ajñana, the sceptical philosophy, though the grammatical structure is identical to the Catuṣkoṭi (and there are numerous other analogues of this fourfold grammatical structure within this Sutta), the intentionality of the architecture employed by Nagarjuna is not evident, as rendered into English by Walshe (1987, 1995: p. 81):

'What is the fourth way? Here, an ascetic or Brahmin is dull and stupid. Because of his dullness and stupidity, when he is questioned he resorts to evasive statements and wriggles like an eel: "If you ask me whether there is another world. But I don't say so. And I don't say otherwise. And I don't say it is not, and I don't not say it is not." "Is there no other world?..." "Is there both another world and no other world?..."Is there neither another world nor no other world?..." "Are there spontaneously-born beings?..." "Are there not...?" "Both...? "Neither...?" "Does the Tathagata exist after death? Does he not exist after death? Does he both exist and not exist after death? Does he neither exist nor not exist after death?..." "If I thought so, I would say so...I don't say so...I don't say it is not." This is the fourth case.'

=== Pyrrhonism ===
McEvilley (2002: p. 495) makes a case for mutual iteration and pervasion between Pyrrhonism and Madhyamika:

An extraordinary similarity, that has long been noticed, between Pyrrhonism and Mādhyamika is the formula known in connection with Buddhism as the fourfold negation (catuṣkoṭi) and which in Pyrrhonic form might be called the fourfold indeterminacy.

=== Nagarjuna ===
The Catuṣkoṭi was employed particularly by Nagarjuna who developed it and engaged it as a 'learning, investigative, meditative' portal to realize the 'openness' (Sanskrit: Śūnyatā), of Shakyamuni's Second Turning of the Dharmacakra, as categorized by the Sandhinirmocana Sutra.

Robinson (1957: p. 294), building on the foundations of Liebenthal (1948) to whom he gives credit, states:

What Nagarjuna wishes to prove is the irrationality of Existence, or the falsehood of reasoning which is built upon the logical principle that A equals A.... Because two answers, assertion and denial, are always possible to a given question, his arguments contain two refutations, one denying the presence, one the absence of the probandum. This double refutation is called the Middle Path. [emphasis evident in Robinson]

Śūnyatā is the ninth 'view' (Sanskrit: dṛṣṭi), the viewless view, a superposition of the eight possible arrays of proposition P [and its 'inseparable contradistinction' (Sanskrit: apoha)].

Positive configuration
1. P
2. Not-P
3. Both P and Not-P
4. Neither P nor Not-P

Negative configuration
1. Not (P)
2. Not (Not-P)
3. Not (Both P and Not-P)
4. Not (Neither P nor Not-P)

The eight arrays or octaves of the iconographic Dharmacakra represent drishti or traditional views that Shakyamuni countered. These eight arrays may be plotted as coordinates on a multidimensional field which may be rendered as a sphere, a mandala, a multidimensional shunya or zero where shunyata denotes zero-ness. The eight arrays are in a concordant relationship where they each constitute a chord to the sphere. The coordinates are equidistant from the epicentre of shunya where the array of the positive configuration (or hemisphere) and the array of the negative configuration (or hemisphere) constitute two polar radii or diametrical complements, a diameter in sum. These are the 'eight limits' (Wylie: mtha' brgyad; Sanskrit: aṣṭānta) of 'openness' (Sanskrit: śūnyatā), where śūnyatā is amplified by 'freedom from constructs' or 'simplicity' (Wylie: spros bral; Sanskrit: aprapañca). Karmay (1988: p. 118) conveys that 'spros bral' is a homologue of 'thig le' (Sanskrit: bindu), where 'spros bral' is literally "without amplification", understood as "that which cannot be displayed".

1. P is true ``1 P is not true or Not P is true
2. Not P is true ``2. Not (Not P) is true i.e. P is true
3. Both P and Not P are true i.e. the universal set `` 3 Neither P nor not P are true i.e. it is a null set
4. Neither P nor not P are true it is a null set `` 4. Not (neither p nor not P are true ) = both P and not P are true which is the universal set.

Thus, a four-fold configuration resurfaces, with positive and negative configurations being mere rewritten alternatives (ie. it makes no difference whether one works with the positive or negative catuskoti). For example, if one replaces P with Not P, then the positive configuration set for Not P will be functionally equivalent to the negative configuration of P.

Sanjaya Belatthiputta, a 6th century BCE Indian ascetic whose teachings are similar to that of Nagarjuna are compared to that of a "theory of eel-wrigglers" in the famous Samannaphala Sutta (DN 2). Sanjaya is recorded as saying:

'If you ask me if there exists another world [after death], if I thought that there exists another world, would I declare that to you? I don't think so. I don't think in that way. I don't think otherwise. I don't think not. I don't think not not. If you asked me if there isn't another world... both is and isn't... neither is nor isn't... if there are beings who transmigrate... if there aren't... both are and aren't... neither are nor aren't... if the Tathagata exists after death... doesn't... both... neither exists nor exists after death, would I declare that to you? I don't think so. I don't think in that way. I don't think otherwise. I don't think not. I don't think not not.'

=== Catuṣkoṭi post-Nagarjuna ===
The Catuṣkoṭi, following Nagarjuna, has had a profound impact upon the development of Buddhist logic and its dialectical refinement of Tibetan Buddhism.

Robinson (1957: p. 294) qualifies the import of Nagarjuna's work (which includes Nagarjuna's application of the Catuskoti) due to the embedded noise in the scholarly lineage: "Certainly some of Nagarjuna's ancient opponents were just as confused as his modern interpreters...". This noise may also have co-arisen with Nagarjuna, following the work of Jayatilleke (1967).

== Modern interpretations ==
Robinson (1957: p. 294) holds that Stcherbatsky (1927), opened a productive period in Madhyamaka studies. Schayer (1933) made a departure into the rules of inference employed by early Buddhist dialecticians and examines the Catuskoti (Tetralemma) as an attribute of propositional logic and critiques Stcherbatsky. Robinson (1957: p. 294) states that "Schayers criticisms of Stcherbatsky are incisive and just." Murti (1955) makes no mention of the logical contribution of Schayer. According to Robinson (1957: p. 294), Murti furthered the work of Stcherbatsky amongst others, and brought what Robinson terms "the metaphysical phase of investigation" to its apogee though qualifies this with: "Murti has a lot to say about 'dialectic,' but practically nothing to say about formal logic." Robinson (1957: p. 294) opines that Nakamura (1954), developed Schayer's methodology and defended and progressed its application.

Robinson (1957: p. 293) opines that the 'metaphysical approach' evident foremost in Murti (1955) was not founded in a firm understanding of the 'logical structure of the system', i.e. catuskoti, for example:

Several fundamental limitations of the metaphysical approach are now apparent. It has tried to find comprehensive answers without knowing the answers to the more restricted questions involved - such questions as those of the epistemological and logical structure of the system.

Robinson (1957: p. 296) conveys his focus and states his methodology, clearly identifying the limitations in scope of this particular publication, which he testifies is principally built upon, though divergent from, the work of Nakamura:

In considering the formal structure of Nagarjuna's argumentation, I exclude epistemology, psychology, and ontology from consideration.... Such extra-logical observations as emerge will be confined to the concluding paragraphs...

== Exegesis ==
Puhakka (2003: p. 134-145) charts the stylized reification process of a human sentient being, the spell of reality, a spell dispelled by the Catuṣkoṭi:

We are typically not aware of ourselves as taking something (P) as real. Rather, its reality "takes us," or already has us in its spell as soon as we become aware of its identity (P). Furthermore, it's impossible to take something (P) to be real without, at least momentarily, ignoring or denying that which it is not (not-P). Thus the act of taking something as real necessarily involves some degree of unconsciousness or lack of awareness. This is true even in the simple act of perception when we see a figure that we become aware of as "something." As the German gestalt psychologists demonstrated, for each figure perceived, there is a background of which we remain relatively unaware. We can extend this to texts or spoken communications. For every text we understand there is a context we are not fully cognizant of. Thus, with every figure noticed or reality affirmed, there is, inevitably, unawareness. Is this how a spell works? It takes us unawares.

== Catuṣkoṭi paradox: a simple complex ==
Wayman (1977) proffers that the Catuṣkoṭi may be employed in different ways and often these are not clearly stated in discussion nor the tradition. Wayman (1977) holds that the Catuṣkoṭi may be applied in suite, that is all are applicable to a given topic forming a paradoxical matrix; or they may be applied like trains running on tracks (or employing another metaphor, four mercury switches where only certain functions or switches are employed at particular times). This difference in particular establishes a distinction with the Greek tradition of the Tetralemma. Also, predicate logic has been applied to the Dharmic Tradition, and though this in some quarters has established interesting correlates and extension of the logico-mathematical traditions of the Greeks, it has also obscured the logico-grammatical traditions of the Dharmic Traditions of Catuṣkoṭi within modern English discourse.

== Four Extremes ==
The 'Four Extremes' (Tibetan: མཐའ་བཞི, Wylie: mtha' bzhi; Sanskrit: Caturanta; Devanagari: चतुरन्त) is a particular application of the Catuṣkoṭi:

- Being (Wylie: yod)
- Non-being (Wylie: med)
- Both being and non-being (Wylie: yod-med)
- Neither being nor non-being (Wylie: yod-med min)

Dumoulin et al.'s (1988, 2005: pp. 43–44), work on Zen models a particular formulation of the Catuṣkoṭi that approaches the Caturanta engaging the Buddhist notion of dharmas, and attribute the model to Nagarjuna:

If we focus on the doctrinal agreement that exists between the Wisdom Sūtras and the tracts of the Mādhyamika we note that both schools characteristically practice a didactic negation. By setting up a series of self-contradictory oppositions, Nāgārjuna disproves all conceivable statements, which can be reduced to these four:

All things (dharmas) exist: affirmation of being, negation of nonbeing
All things (dharmas) do not exist: affirmation of nonbeing, negation of being
All things (dharmas) both exist and do not exist: both affirmation and negation
All things (dharmas) neither exist nor do not exist: neither affirmation nor negation

With the aid of these four alternatives (catuṣkoṭika: affirmation, negation, double affirmation, double negation), Nāgārjuna rejects all firm standpoints and traces a middle path between being and nonbeing. Most likely the eight negations, arranged in couplets in Chinese, can be traced back to Nāgārjuna: neither destruction nor production, neither annihilation nor permanence, neither unity nor difference, neither coming nor going.

=== Alternate Four Limits/Four Extremes ===
A Mantrayana enumeration of the Four Limits or the Four Extremes within the Buddhadharma is also common. These four limits are evident in the earliest sutras of the Theravadin of the First Turning, through the Second Turning philosophy of Nagarjuna and his disciples and commentators and also evident in the Third Turning as evidenced in the presentation of Padmasambhava. Padmasambhava in his "Secret Instruction in a Garland of Vision" (Tibetan: མན་ངག་ལྟ་བའི་ཕྲེང་བ, Wylie: man ngag lta ba'i phreng ba) lists them as follows with the English rendering following Dowman (2003) and Wylie following Norbu et al. (2001):

- the 'Hedonist' or 'Chalpas' (Tibetan: ཕྱལ་པ, Wylie: phyal pa): does not perceive, ascribe to the view or realize that all events, dharmas, etc. have a cause and an effect;
- the 'Atheist' or 'Gyangphenpas' (Tibetan: རྒྱང་འཕེན་པ, Wylie: rgyang 'phen pa): unable to see or perceive past and future lives, the atheist toils for wealth and power in this lifetime alone. They engage in intrigue;
- the 'Nihilist' or 'Murthugpas' (Tibetan: མུར་ཐུག་པ, Wylie: mur thug pa): holds that there is no causality or causal relationship between events and dharmas. They are of the view that everything is adventitiously arisen due to chance and events and that dharmas dissipate and vanish into the void. Death is the ultimate cessation and there is no continuity between lives; and
- the 'Eternalist' or 'Mutegpas' (Tibetan: མུ་སྟེགས་པ, Wylie: mu stegs pa): holds to the view of an eternal, unchanging 'atman', where atman is often rendered as 'soul' in English. There is considerable diversity of the mechanics of causality with proponents of this view. Some perceive the atman as having a cause but not effect, an effect but no cause, or indeed a complex causality or causal relationship.

=== Lexicon: technical language and terminology ===
Within English Buddhist logico-epistemological discourse, there is and has been historically, much obstruction to an understanding of the Caturanta (as the Catuṣkoṭi) due to inherent negligence in terminology not being clearly defined from the outset. That said, acquisition of terminology must be engaged and actualized though the sadhana of the 'mūla prajñā', as definitions are slippery and challenging to pinpoint that hold for all contexts. Language usage in Buddhist logic is not intuitive but technical and must be learnt, acquired through the perfection and power of 'diligence' (Sanskrit: vīrya). The following quotations are cited to provide insight (in lieu of technical definitions) into the understanding of the technical Buddhist terms 'existence', 'nature', 'being', 'entity' and 'svabhava' which are all mutually qualifying.

Robinson (1957: p. 297) renders Mūlamadhyamakakārikā 21.14, thus:

"He who posits an entity becomes entangled in eternalism and annihilism,
since that entity has to be either permanent or impermanent."

Robinson (1957: p. 300) in discussing the Buddhist logic of Nagarjuna, frames a view of 'svabhava':

Svabhava is by defini[t]ion the subject of contradictory ascriptions. If it exists, it must belong to an existent entity, which means that it must be conditioned, dependent on other entities, and possessed of causes. But a svabhava is by definition unconditioned, not dependent on other entities, and not caused. Thus the existence of a svabhava is impossible. [NB: typographical errors repaired]

"Nature" (a gloss of prakrti which in this context equals svabhava) does not entail an alter-entity:

The term "nature" (prakrti equals svabhava) has no complement..."If (anythings) existence is due to its nature, its non-existence will not occur, since the alter-entity (complement) of a nature never occurs." (Mūlamadhyamakakārikā, 15.8)

That is, a nature is the class of properties attributed to a class of terms. Since they are necessarily present throughout the range of the subject or class of subjects, cases of their absence do not occur.

Y Karunadasa (1999, 2000: p. 1) holds that Early Buddhism and early Buddhist discourse "often refer to the mutual opposition between two views":

- 'permanence' or 'eternalism' (Pali: sassatavada) also sometimes referred to as 'the belief in being' (Pali: bhava-ditti); and
- 'annihilation' or 'nihilism' (Pali: ucchadevada) also sometimes referred to as 'the belief in non-being' (Pali: vibhava-ditti).

As Shakyamuni relates in a 'thread' (Sanskrit: sūtra) of discourse to Kaccānagotta in the Kaccānagotta Sutta, rendered into English by Myanmar Piṭaka Association Editorial Committee (1993: p. 35):

"For the most part, Kaccāna, sentient beings depend on two kinds of belief - belief that 'there is' (things exist) and belief that 'there is not' (things do not exist).

Y Karunadasa (1999, 2000: p. 1) states that:

...it is within the framework of the Buddhist critique of sassatavada and ucchadavada that the Buddhist doctrines seem to assume their significance. For it is through the demolition of these two world-views that Buddhism seeks to construct its own world-view. The conclusion is that it was as a critical response to the mutual opposition between these two views that Buddhism emerged as a new faith amidst many other faiths.

== See also ==
- Dialetheism
- Logical connective
- Paraconsistent logic
- Prasangika
- Semiotic square
- Term logic
- Tetralemma
- Two-truths doctrine
