= Pakudha Kaccayana =

6th-century BCE Indian philosopher

Views of the six heretical teachers
- The views of six śramaṇa in the Pāli Canon, known as the six heretical teachers, based on the Sāmaññaphala Sutta.

Pūraṇa Kassapa
- Amoralism (akiriyavāda; natthikavāda): There is no reward or punishment for either good or bad deeds.

Makkhali Gośāla (Ājīvika)
- Fatalism (ahetukavāda; niyativāda): We are powerless; suffering is pre-destined.

Ajita Kesakambalī (Charvaka)
- Materialism (ucchedavāda; natthikavāda): Live happily; with death, all is annihilated.

Pakudha Kaccāyana
- Eternalism and categoricalism (sassatavāda; sattakāyavāda): Matter, pleasure, pain and the soul are eternal and do not interact.

Nigaṇṭha Ñāṭaputta (Jainism)
- Restraint (mahāvrata): Be endowed with, cleansed by, and suffused with [merely] the avoidance of all evil.

Sañjaya Belaṭṭhiputta (Ajñana)
- Agnosticism (amarāvikkhepavāda): "I don't think so. I don't think in that way or otherwise. I don't think not or not not." Suspension of judgement.

Pakudha Kaccāyana was an Indian teacher and philosopher who lived around the 6th century BCE, contemporaneous with Mahavira and the Buddha.

== Early life ==
According to the Pali Canon, Kacayana was his family name and he is said to have belonged to a Baman Family (meaning followers of dharma). He was sometimes called Pakkudha Katiyana, Kadhudha Katiyana, Pakudha Katyayana, or Kakudha Katyayana.

== Teachings ==
According to Pakudha, there are seven eternal "elements": Earth, Water, Fire, Air, Joy, Sorrow and Life. Pakudha further asserted that these elements do not interact with one another.

The Samannaphala Sutta (DN 2) represents Pakudha's views as follows:

"'...[T]here are these seven substances — unmade, irreducible, uncreated, without a creator, barren, stable as a mountain-peak, standing firm like a pillar — that do not alter, do not change, do not interfere with one another, are incapable of causing one another pleasure, pain, or both pleasure and pain. Which seven? The earth-substance, the liquid-substance, the fire-substance, the wind-substance, pleasure, pain, and the soul as the seventh. These are the seven substances — unmade, irreducible, uncreated, without a creator, barren, stable as a mountain-peak, standing firm like a pillar — that do not alter, do not change, do not interfere with one another, and are incapable of causing one another pleasure, pain, or both pleasure and pain.
"'And among them there is no killer nor one who causes killing, no hearer nor one who causes hearing, no cognizer nor one who causes cognition. When one cuts off [another person's] head, there is no one taking anyone's life. It is simply between the seven substances that the sword passes.'"

In the Brahmajāla Sutta (DN 1), Sassatavāda (eternalism) is defined as the doctrine that the soul and the world are perpetual and unmoving.

According to Buddhaghosa, he suffered from many obsessional rituals with regard to the use of water, avoiding the use of cold water and always using hot; when this was not available, he did not wash. If he crossed a stream he would consider this a sin, and would make expiation by constructing a mound of earth.

He did not speak of God, the soul or the other world, which has led some scholars to class him as a materialist.

== See also ==
- Shramana
- Samannaphala Sutta
- Brahmajala Sutta
- Merit (Buddhism)

== Sources ==
- Bhaskar, Bhagchandra Jain (1972). Jainism in Buddhist Literature. Alok Prakashan: Nagpur. Available on-line at http://jainfriends.tripod.com/books/jiblcontents.html.
- Ñāṇamoli, Bhikkhu (trans.) and Bodhi, Bhikkhu (ed.) (2001). The Middle-Length Discourses of the Buddha: A Translation of the Majjhima Nikāya. Boston: Wisdom Publications. ISBN 0-86171-072-X.
- Rhys Davids, T.W. & William Stede (eds.) (1921-5). The Pali Text Society’s Pali–English Dictionary. Chipstead: Pali Text Society. A general on-line search engine for the PED is available at http://dsal.uchicago.edu/dictionaries/pali/.
- Thanissaro Bhikkhu (trans.) (1997). Samaññaphala Sutta: The Fruits of the Contemplative Life (DN 2). Available on-line at http://www.accesstoinsight.org/tipitaka/dn/dn.02.0.than.html.
- Walshe, Maurice O'Connell (trans.) (1995). The Long Discourses of the Buddha: A Translation of the Dīgha Nikāya. Somerville: Wisdom Publications. ISBN 0-86171-103-3.
