= Sanjaya Belatthiputta =

6th-century BC Indian ascetic teacher

Personal life
- Flourished: 6th century BCE

Religious life
- Religion: Ajñana

Views of the six heretical teachers
- The views of six śramaṇa in the Pāli Canon, known as the six heretical teachers, based on the Sāmaññaphala Sutta.

Pūraṇa Kassapa
- Amoralism (akiriyavāda; natthikavāda): There is no reward or punishment for either good or bad deeds.

Makkhali Gośāla (Ājīvika)
- Fatalism (ahetukavāda; niyativāda): We are powerless; suffering is pre-destined.

Ajita Kesakambalī (Charvaka)
- Materialism (ucchedavāda; natthikavāda): Live happily; with death, all is annihilated.

Pakudha Kaccāyana
- Eternalism and categoricalism (sassatavāda; sattakāyavāda): Matter, pleasure, pain and the soul are eternal and do not interact.

Nigaṇṭha Ñāṭaputta (Jainism)
- Restraint (mahāvrata): Be endowed with, cleansed by, and suffused with [merely] the avoidance of all evil.

Sañjaya Belaṭṭhiputta (Ajñana)
- Agnosticism (amarāvikkhepavāda): "I don't think so. I don't think in that way or otherwise. I don't think not or not not." Suspension of judgement.

Sañjaya Belatthiputra (Pali: Sañjaya Belaṭṭhiputta; Sanskrit: Sañjaya Vairatiputra; literally, "Sañjaya of the Belattha clan"), was an Indian ascetic philosopher who lived around the 7th-6th century BC in the region of Magadha. He was contemporaneous with Mahavira, Makkhali Gosala, Ajita Kesakambali and the Buddha, and was a proponent of the ajñana school of thought.

== Teacher ==
Sanjaya is thought to be the first teacher of the future Buddha's future two great disciples, Maha-Moggallana and Sariputta. Both of them were followers of a person named Sanjaya Paribajjaka (Sanjaya the wanderer). Historically, Sanjaya Paribajjaka is considered to be same as Sanjaya Belatthiputta by many scholars. These two future arahants ultimately left Sanjaya's tutelage as it did not address their unresolved desire to end ultimate suffering. Sanjaya Paribajjaka also had a follower named Suppiya, and so was Tattvalabdha, a minister at the court of King Ajatashatru.

== Thought ==
Hecker (1994) contextualizes Sanjaya's thought as "a kind of dialectical existentialism" in juxtaposition to the popular materialist views of the day (for instance, typified by the ascetic teacher Ajita Kesakambalī.) Chakravarty (2021) expounds that Sanjaya navigated clashes of ideas and disputes by steadfastly withholding judgments, especially concerning metaphysical and ethical debates. He crafted a methodical five-fold response, as a means to abstain from adopting positions on any philosophical viewpoint. Chakravarty terms Sanjaya's systematic approach in Sanskrit as amarakathananilambana.

In the Samannaphala Sutta (DN 2), Sanjaya is recorded as saying:

'If you ask me if there exists another world [after death], if I thought that there exists another world, would I declare that to you? I don't think so. I don't think in that way. I don't think otherwise. I don't think not. I don't think not not. If you asked me if there isn't another world... both is and isn't... neither is nor isn't... if there are beings who transmigrate... if there aren't... both are and aren't... neither are nor aren't... if the Tathagata exists after death... doesn't... both... neither exists nor exists after death, would I declare that to you? I don't think so. I don't think in that way. I don't think otherwise. I don't think not. I don't think not not.'

=== Commentary ===
In the Pali literature, Sanjaya's teachings have been characterized as "evasive" or "agnostic". In the Brahmajala Sutta (DN 1), Sanjaya's views are deemed to be amaravikkhepavada, "endless equivocation" or "a theory of eel-wrigglers."

In Jaina literature, Sanjaya is identified as a Jaina sage (Skt., muni). It is believed that he was influenced by Jaina doctrine although Jaina philosophers were critical of Sanjaya.

== Sources ==
- Bhaskar, Bhagchandra Jain (1972). Jainism in Buddhist Literature. Alok Prakashan: Nagpur. Available on-line at http://jainfriends.tripod.com/books/jiblcontents.html.
- Chakravarty, Anish (2021). Sañjaya’s Ajñānavāda and Mahāvīra’s Anekāntavāda: From Agnosticism to Pluralism in K.M. Pathak (ed.) Quietism, Agnosticism and Mysticism: Mapping the Philosophical Discourse of the East and the West. Singapore: Springer Nature. ISBN 978-981-16-3222-8.
- Hecker, Hellmuth (1994). Maha-Moggallana (BPS Wheel 263). Available on-line at http://www.accesstoinsight.org/lib/authors/hecker/wheel263.html.
- Ñāṇamoli, Bhikkhu (trans.) and Bodhi, Bhikkhu (ed.) (2001). The Middle-Length Discourses of the Buddha: A Translation of the Majjhima Nikāya. Boston: Wisdom Publications. ISBN 0-86171-072-X.
- Thanissaro Bhikkhu (trans.) (1997). Samaññaphala Sutta: The Fruits of the Contemplative Life (DN 2). Available on-line at http://www.accesstoinsight.org/tipitaka/dn/dn.02.0.than.html.
- Walshe, Maurice O'Connell (trans.) (1995). The Long Discourses of the Buddha: A Translation of the Dīgha Nikāya. Somerville: Wisdom Publications. ISBN 0-86171-103-3.
