= Purana Kassapa =

6th century BCE Indian philosopher

Views of the six heretical teachers
- The views of six śramaṇa in the Pāli Canon, known as the six heretical teachers, based on the Sāmaññaphala Sutta.

Pūraṇa Kassapa
- Amoralism (akiriyavāda; natthikavāda): There is no reward or punishment for either good or bad deeds.

Makkhali Gośāla (Ājīvika)
- Fatalism (ahetukavāda; niyativāda): We are powerless; suffering is pre-destined.

Ajita Kesakambalī (Charvaka)
- Materialism (ucchedavāda; natthikavāda): Live happily; with death, all is annihilated.

Pakudha Kaccāyana
- Eternalism and categoricalism (sassatavāda; sattakāyavāda): Matter, pleasure, pain and the soul are eternal and do not interact.

Nigaṇṭha Ñāṭaputta (Jainism)
- Restraint (mahāvrata): Be endowed with, cleansed by, and suffused with [merely] the avoidance of all evil.

Sañjaya Belaṭṭhiputta (Ajñana)
- Agnosticism (amarāvikkhepavāda): "I don't think so. I don't think in that way or otherwise. I don't think not or not not." Suspension of judgement.

Purana Kassapa (IAST: Pūrṇa Kāśyapa; Pali: Pūraṇa Kassapa) was an Indian ascetic teacher who lived around the 6th century BCE, contemporaneous with Mahavira and Shakyamuni Buddha.

== Biography ==
Purana taught a theory of "non-action" (Pāli, Skt.: akiriyāvāda) whereby the body acts independent of the soul, merit or demerit. In the Pali Canon, Purana (along with the ascetic Makkhali Gosala) is identified as an ahetuvadin, "denier of a cause" (of merit).

As an example of Purana's beliefs, in the Samannaphala Sutta (DN 2) it is reported that Purana said:

"...[I]n acting or getting others to act, in mutilating or getting others to mutilate, in torturing or getting others to torture, in inflicting sorrow or in getting others to inflict sorrow, in tormenting or getting others to torment, in intimidating or getting others to intimidate, in taking life, taking what is not given, breaking into houses, plundering wealth, committing burglary, ambushing highways, committing adultery, speaking falsehood — one does no evil. If with a razor-edged disk one were to turn all the living beings on this earth to a single heap of flesh, a single pile of flesh, there would be no evil from that cause, no coming of evil. Even if one were to go along the right bank of the Ganga, killing and getting others to kill, mutilating and getting others to mutilate, torturing and getting others to torture, there would be no evil from that cause, no coming of evil. Even if one were to go along the left bank of the Ganga, giving and getting others to give, making sacrifices and getting others to make sacrifices, there would be no merit from that cause, no coming of merit. Through generosity, self-control, restraint, and truthful speech there is no merit from that cause, no coming of merit.'

The Anguttara Nikaya also reports that Purana claimed to be omniscient. The Dhammapada commentary claims that Purana died by drowning himself.

== See also ==
- Merit (Buddhism)
- Sramana
- Samannaphala Sutta

== Sources ==
- Bhaskar, Bhagchandra Jain (1972). Jainism in Buddhist Literature. Alok Prakashan: Nagpur. On-line http://jainfriends.tripod.com/books/jiblcontents.html.
- Ñāṇamoli, Bhikkhu (trans.) and Bodhi, Bhikkhu (ed.) (2001). The Middle-Length Discourses of the Buddha: A Translation of the Majjhima Nikāya. Boston: Wisdom Publications. ISBN 0-86171-072-X.
- Rhys Davids, T.W. & William Stede (eds.) (1921-5). The Pali Text Society's Pali–English Dictionary. Chipstead: Pali Text Society. On-line version http://dsal.uchicago.edu/dictionaries/pali/.
- Thanissaro Bhikkhu (trans.) (1997). Samaññaphala Sutta: The Fruits of the Contemplative Life (DN 2). On-line http://www.accesstoinsight.org/tipitaka/dn/dn.02.0.than.html.
- Walshe, Maurice O'Connell (trans.) (1995). The Long Discourses of the Buddha: A Translation of the Dīgha Nikāya. Somerville: Wisdom Publications. ISBN 0-86171-103-3.
