= Heresy in Buddhism =

Views of the six heretical teachers
- The views of six śramaṇa in the Pāli Canon, known as the six heretical teachers, based on the Sāmaññaphala Sutta.

Pūraṇa Kassapa
- Amoralism (akiriyavāda; natthikavāda): There is no reward or punishment for either good or bad deeds.

Makkhali Gośāla (Ājīvika)
- Fatalism (ahetukavāda; niyativāda): We are powerless; suffering is pre-destined.

Ajita Kesakambalī (Charvaka)
- Materialism (ucchedavāda; natthikavāda): Live happily; with death, all is annihilated.

Pakudha Kaccāyana
- Eternalism and categoricalism (sassatavāda; sattakāyavāda): Matter, pleasure, pain and the soul are eternal and do not interact.

Nigaṇṭha Ñāṭaputta (Jainism)
- Restraint (mahāvrata): Be endowed with, cleansed by, and suffused with [merely] the avoidance of all evil.

Sañjaya Belaṭṭhiputta (Ajñana)
- Agnosticism (amarāvikkhepavāda): "I don't think so. I don't think in that way or otherwise. I don't think not or not not." Suspension of judgement.

Tīrthika (Sanskrit: tīrthika, "ford-maker," meaning one who is attempting to cross the stream of saṃsāra) or titthiya (Pali) in Buddhism is a term referring to non-Buddhist heretics.

In the Tipitaka, the term titthiya may refer specifically to adherents of Jainism, Brahmanism, and the six heretical teachers. Whereas a Buddhist takes refuge in the Three Jewels and treads the Middle Way between extremes, a titthiya does not. According to the Asoka Avadhana, the titthiyas that were jealous of Asoka's preaching of Buddhism gathered together and said to each other, "Should this king Asoka continue a worshipper of Buddha, all other persons encouraged by him would likewise become followers of Buddha." They then went to people's houses and declared that their religion is the true religion and that Buddhism gives no moksha.

Tīrthika is associated with the Jain term tirthankara "ford-maker".

== Etymology ==
Etymologically, the word titthiya is formed from the root word tittha combined with the suffix -iya (derived from the suffix -ika, where the consonant 'k' is grammatically altered to 'y'). The word tittha itself originates from the Vedic term tīrtha—derived from the root *ter or tarate, meaning "to pass through"—which originally denoted a river fording place, landing place, or harbor. Figuratively, this "fording place" (tittha) was understood as a means or a person to help cross over a difficulty or doubt, though its meaning later shifted to denote a sect or belief (typically carrying a negative connotation as an order that promises salvation to its votaries but only leads them into error). Consequently, the term titthiya (which literally refers to someone who is born into, lives in, or devotes themselves to a tittha or such views) is ultimately used to specifically describe an adherent of another religion or sect, a heretical teacher, or a non-Buddhist.

== In the Pali Canon ==
In the Pali Canon, the term titthiya can be found in various forms:

- aññatitthiyā ("followers of other religions"),
- titthiyehi titthiyasāvakehi ("monastics of other religions and their disciples"),
- nānātitthiyā ("who follow various other religions").

The usages are on these following sutta:

- Dīgha Nikāya (DN):
  - Mahāsīhanāda Sutta (DN 8)
  - Poṭṭhapāda Sutta (DN 9)
  - Mahāparinibbāna Sutta (DN 16)
  - Pāthika Sutta (DN 24)
  - Udumbarika Sutta (DN 25)
  - Sampasādanīya Sutta (DN 28)
  - Pāsādika Sutta (DN 29)
- Majjhima Nikāya (MN):
  - Cūḷasīhanāda Sutta (MN 11)
  - Mahādukkhakkhandha Sutta (MN 13)
  - Aṭṭhakanāgara Sutta (MN 52)
  - Upāli Sutta (MN 56)
  - Kukkuravatika Sutta (MN 57)
  - Bahuvedanīya Sutta (MN 59)
  - Mahāmālukya Sutta (MN 64)
  - Bhaddāli Sutta (MN 65)
  - Mahāvaccha Sutta (MN 73)
  - Māgaṇḍiya Sutta (MN 75)
  - Mahāsakuludāyi Sutta (MN 77)
  - Mahāsuññata Sutta (MN 122)
  - Mahākammavibhaṅga Sutta (MN 136)
  - Nagaravindeyya Sutta (MN 150)
- Saṁyutta Nikāya (SN):
  - Nānātitthiyasāvaka Sutta (SN 2.30)
  - Acelakassapa Sutta (SN 12.17)
  - Aññatitthiya Sutta (SN 12.24)
- Aṅguttara Nikāya (AN):
  - Samacitta Vagga (AN 2.32-41)
  - Devaloka Sutta (AN 3.18)
  - Aññatitthiya Sutta (AN 3.68)
  - Paviveka Sutta (AN 3.93)
  - Hatthaka Sutta (AN 3.127)
  - Brāhamaṇsacca Sutta (AN 4.185)
  - Bhaddiya Sutta (AN 4.193)
  - Hatthisāriputta Sutta (AN 6.60)
  - Paṭhamaniddasa Sutta (AN 7.42)
  - Dutiyaniddasa Sutta (AN 7.43)
  - Sīha Sutta (AN 8.12)
  - Anuruddhamahāvitakka Sutta (AN 8.30)
  - Mūlaka Suta (AN 8.83)
  - Sambodhi Sutta (AN 9.1)
  - Saupādisesa Sutta (AN 9.12)
  - Nāga Sutta (AN 9.40)
  - Paṭhamamahāpañhā Sutta (AN 10.27)
  - Mūlaka Sutta (AN 10.58)
  - Paṭhamakathāvatthu Sutta (AN 10.69)
  - Kiṁdiṭṭhika Sutta (AN 10.93)
  - Vajjiyamāhita Sutta (AN 10.94)
  - Aṭṭhakanāgara Sutta (AN 11.16)
  - Ajita Sutta (AN 10.116)
- Khuddaka Nikāya (KN):
  - Dhammapada (Dhp):
    - Dhammaṭṭha Vagga (Dhp 256–272): name of a section called "Titthiyavatthu"
    - Niraya Vagga (Dhp 306–319): name of a section called "Titthiyasāvakavatthu"
  - Udāna (Ud):
    - Paṭhamanānātitthiya Sutta (Ud 6.4)
    - Dutiyanānātitthiya Sutta (Ud 6.5)
    - Tatiyanānātitthiya Sutta (Ud 6.6)

== Six Heretical Teachers ==
The Six Heretical Teachers, Six Heretics, Six Śramaṇa, or Six Tirthikas (tirthankaras) were six sectarian contemporaries of Gautama Buddha (Śākyamuni), each of whom held a view in opposition to his teachings. Except for Nigantha Nataputta or Mahavira, the twenty-fourth Tirthankara Of Jainism, the other five heretical teachers were regarded as the holders of some or other form of Akiriyavada views.

In Buddhist tradition, they were defeated by Buddha in the miracle contest known as the Twin Miracle.

The six heretics and their views on Indian philosophy are described in detail in the Samaññaphala Sutta of the Digha Nikaya in the Pali Tipitaka.

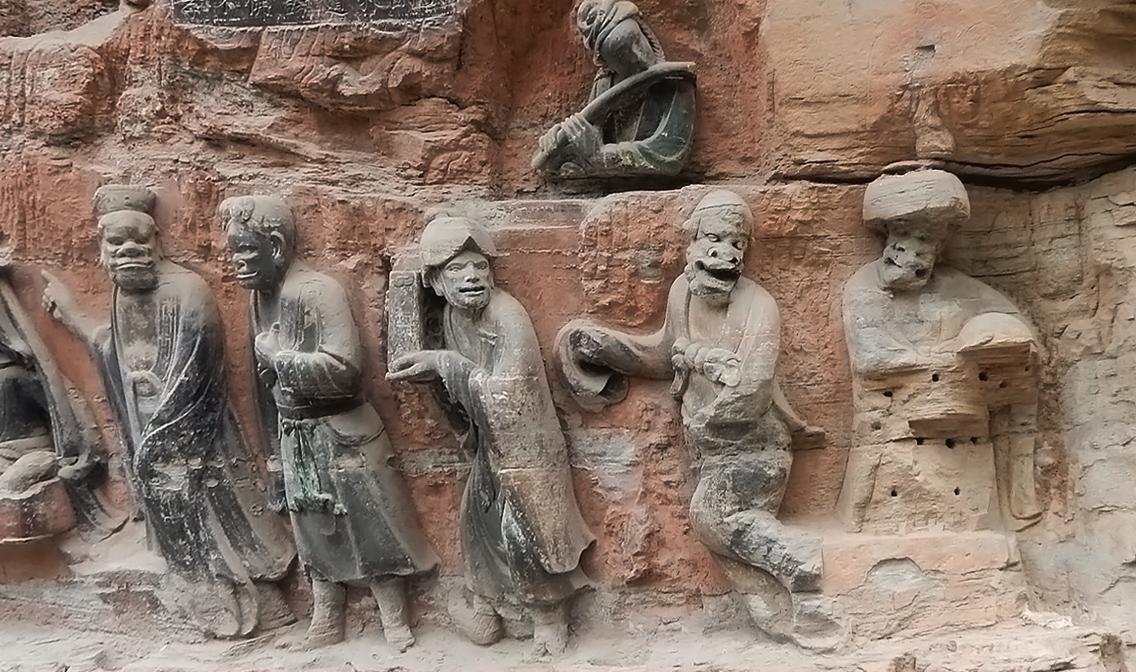
Dazu Rock Carvings depicting five of the Six Heretical Teachers: Purana Kassapa, Makkhali Gosala, Sanjaya Belatthiputta, Ajita Kesakambali, Pakudha Kaccāyana (left to right)

=== Background ===
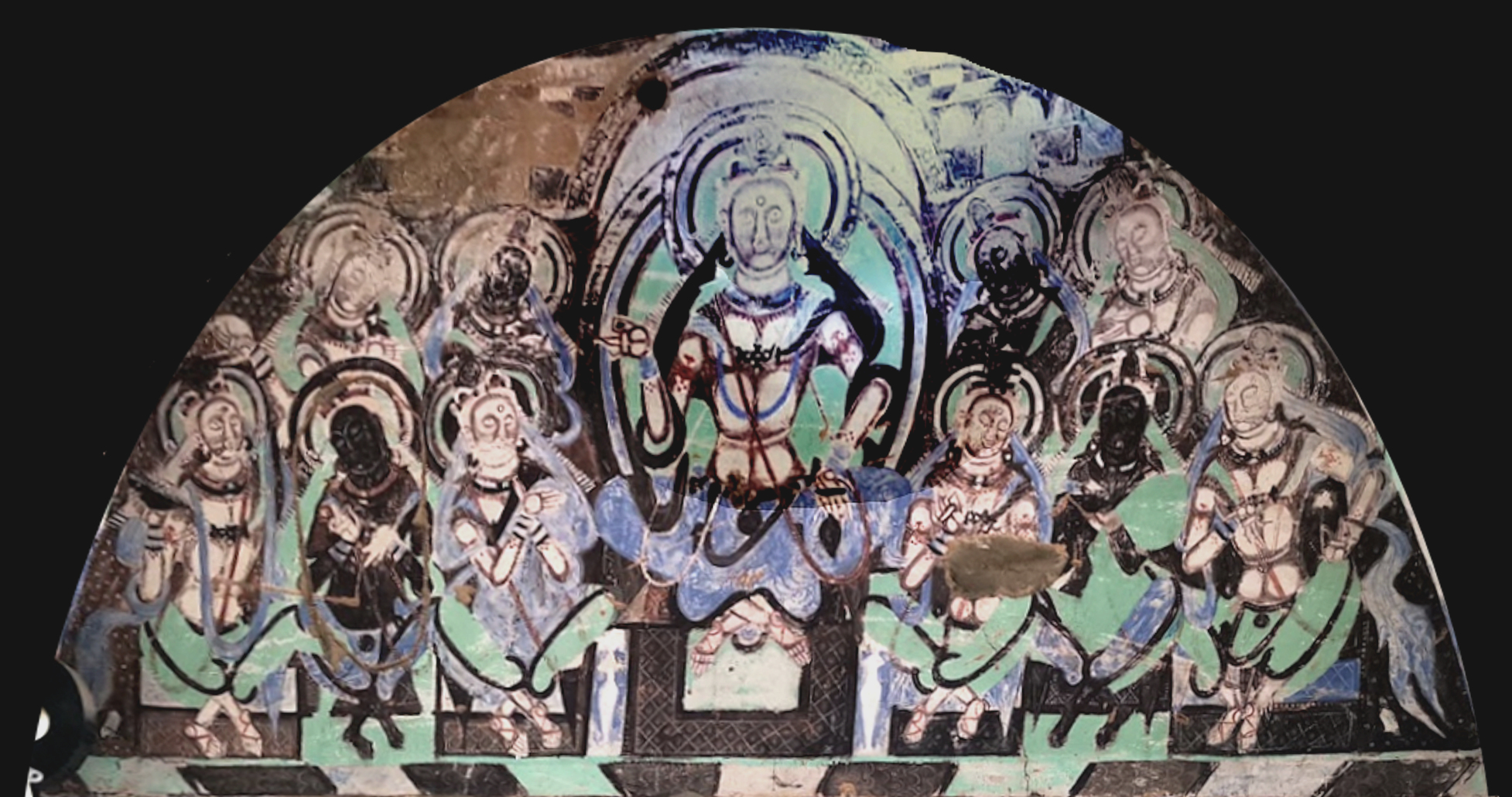
Depiction of the Six Heretical Teachers in the Kizil Caves

According to the sutra, King Ajātasattu visited Gautama Buddha, who, at the time, was living in the mango grove of Jīvaka in Rajagaha among 1250 bhikkhus. The king posed the Buddha the question of whether or not it was possible that the life of a śramaṇa could bear fruit in the same way as the lives of craftsmen bear fruit, declaring that he had previously asked six teachers (Pūraṇa Kassapa, Makkhali Gosāla, Ajita Kesakambala, Pakudha Kaccāyana, Nigaṇṭha Nāṭaputta and Sañjaya Belaṭṭhaputta) the same question, yet had not found a satisfactory answer. At the Buddha's request, King Ajātasattu describes, the answers given to him by the six other teachers.

The names below are provided in Sanskrit, with the equivalent Pali names given in parentheses.

=== Pūrṇa Kāśyapa (Pūraṇa Kassapa) ===
The first spiritual teacher to whom Ajātasattu posed his question was Pūraṇa Kassapa. Kassapa posited the theory of akiriyāvāda (non-doing): actions considered good and evil carried no inherent morality and thus there exists no future consequence from committing either "good" or "evil" deeds.

=== Maskarī Gośālīputra (Makkhali Gosāla) ===
Makkhali Gosala, the second teacher visited by Ajātasattu, subscribed to the doctrine of non-causality; the attainment of any condition is dependent on circumstance, fate, or nature rather than human will and events lack in root cause. Like Kassapa, Gosāla denied the existence of karma and vipaka. This doctrine has been likened to fatalism and determinism. His theory is also called the theory of causelessness (Ahetukavāda), or the theory of natural purity (Saṃsārasuddhivāda).

=== Ajita Keśakambala (Ajita Kesakambala) ===
Ajita Kesakambala followed Gosāla as the third teacher mentioned by Ajātasattu. He is thought to be a materialist (Bhautikavādi), nihilist (Ucchedavādi) and an exponent of non-efficacy of kamma (Akiriyavādi). Kesakambala held that all in existence was merely the process of natural phenomena and vehemently denied the existence of any life after death; "A man is built up of the four elements', when he dies, earth returns to the aggregate of earth, water to water, fire to fire, air to air, and the senses vanish into space."

=== Kakuda Kātyāyana (Pakudha Kaccāyana) ===
Pakudha Kaccāyana, the fourth teacher referred to by Ajātasattu, was an atomist who posited that all things were made up of earth, fire, air, water, pleasure, pain, and the soul, which were unchangeable and eternal. Thus objects, like living beings, composed of the elements are subject to change, while the elements themselves are absolutely fixed in their existences. Thus, by this dualist view, actions are defined solely by the physical interaction between these substances, rather than the moral value ascribed to them.

=== Nirgraṇṭha Jñātiputra (Nigaṇṭha Ñāṭaputta) ===
Nigaṇṭha Nāṭaputta, the 24th Jain tirthankara Mahavira, was the fifth teacher who Ajātasattu questioned. Nāṭaputta answered Ajātasattu with a description of Jain teachings, which, unlike the previous teachers recognized morality and consequences in the afterlife. The philosophy of Nāṭaputta, however, varied from that of Buddha in its belief that involuntary actions, like voluntary actions, carry karmic weight; Buddhism holds that intention is karma.

=== Saṃjaya Vairāṣṭrikaputra (Sañjaya Belaṭṭhaputta) ===
Sañjaya Belaṭṭhaputta was the sixth and final teacher referenced by Ajātasattu . He is said to have replied to King Ajātasattu as follows:

If you ask me whether there is another world, and if I thought there were, I would tell you so. But I do not say so. I do not say that it is thus or thus; I do not say that it is otherwise; I do not say that I deny it; I do not say that I do not deny it; I do not say that there is, there is not, is and is not, neither is nor is not, another world. If you ask me whether there are beings of spontaneous birth...whether there is any fruit, any result, of good or bad actions...whether a man who has won the truth continues to be after death... (The same answer is repeated after each of these problems as in the answer of the first question)

Belaṭṭhaputta did not provide Ajātasattu with a clear answer to his question one way or another, leading some scholars to align him with Ajñana, an agnostic school of Indian philosophy which held that metaphysical knowledge was impossible to obtain.

== See also ==
- Samaññaphala Sutta
- Mleccha
