= Ajñana =

One of the nāstika or "heterodox" schools of ancient Indian philosophy

Views of the six heretical teachers
- The views of six śramaṇa in the Pāli Canon, known as the six heretical teachers, based on the Sāmaññaphala Sutta.

Pūraṇa Kassapa
- Amoralism (akiriyavāda; natthikavāda): There is no reward or punishment for either good or bad deeds.

Makkhali Gośāla (Ājīvika)
- Fatalism (ahetukavāda; niyativāda): We are powerless; suffering is pre-destined.

Ajita Kesakambalī (Charvaka)
- Materialism (ucchedavāda; natthikavāda): Live happily; with death, all is annihilated.

Pakudha Kaccāyana
- Eternalism and categoricalism (sassatavāda; sattakāyavāda): Matter, pleasure, pain and the soul are eternal and do not interact.

Nigaṇṭha Ñāṭaputta (Jainism)
- Restraint (mahāvrata): Be endowed with, cleansed by, and suffused with [merely] the avoidance of all evil.

Sañjaya Belaṭṭhiputta (Ajñana)
- Agnosticism (amarāvikkhepavāda): "I don't think so. I don't think in that way or otherwise. I don't think not or not not." Suspension of judgement.

Ajñāna (Sanskrit: अज्ञान, (Vedic) IPA: /ɐd͡ʑ.ɲɑː.nɐ/; (Classical) IPA: /ɐd͡ʑˈɲɑː.n̪ɐ/) is an ancient nāstika, or 'heterodox,' Indian school of agnosticism that embraces radical skepticism. It emerged as a Śramaṇa movement and was a major rival of early Buddhism, Jainism and the Ājīvika school. They have been recorded in Buddhist and Jain texts. They held that it was impossible to obtain knowledge of metaphysical nature or ascertain the truth value of philosophical propositions; and even if knowledge was possible, it was useless and disadvantageous for final salvation. They specialized in refutation without propagating any positive doctrine of their own. Sanjaya Belatthiputta was one of the major proponents of this school of thought.

== Sources ==
All of our knowledge of the Ajñāna comes from Buddhists and Jain sources. The Ajñāna viewpoints are recorded in Theravada Buddhism's Pāli Canon in the Brahmajala Sutta and Samaññaphala Sutta and in the Sūyagaḍaṃga of Jainism. Along with these texts, the sayings and opinions of the Sceptics (ajñānikāḥ, ajñānināḥ) has been preserved by the ninth century Jain writer Silanka, in his commentary on the Sutrakritanga. Silanka considers sceptics "those who claim that scepticism is best" or as "those in whom no knowledge, i.e. scepticism, is evident". Apart from the specific technical meaning, Silanka also uses the word ajñānikah in a more general sense to mean anyone who is ignorant.

== Origin ==
The traces of scepticism can be found in Vedic sources such as in the Nasadiya hymn in Rigveda. K. N. Jayatilleke notes "sporadic" traces of "scepticism and agnosticism" from the Rigveda onward, but no "widespread scepticism". In the Brahmanas and Early Upanishads, doubt regarding a person's existence after death is cast, while Yajñavalkya argued for the impossibility of knowing the ultimate reality or the atman. Jayatilleke states that these Vedic "sceptical hints" and Upanishadic "agnostic trends" could have "paved the way for the growth of sceptical schools of thought".

However, the flourishing of sceptical thought seems to have occurred in a period with diverse, conflicting, and irreconcilable theories, regarding morality, metaphysics, and religious beliefs. Jayatilleke argues that "the impetus and the occasion" for the rise of the Sceptics was the presence of such rival doctrines. It is natural, in the absence of a commonly accepted criterion of truth, for some people to wonder if any theory could be true at all. The Sceptics specifically pointed to the conflicting theories of atman and the requirement of omniscience, and hence the criticism of omniscience, to obtain true knowledge. They argued that mutually contradictory claims to knowledge undermined confidence in any single metaphysical doctrine, and that limited knowledge could not verify claim to omniscience.

A proliferation of viewpoints existed during the period immediately preceding the rise of Buddhism, as attested in the Buddhist and Jain texts. The Buddhist Brahmajal Sutta lists four types (or schools) of Sceptics along with fifty-eight other schools of thought, while the Jain Sutrakrtanga lists sixty-seven "schools" of Sceptics among three hundred and sixty-three different schools of thought. While the list is artificially constructed according to Jain categories, the four main schools of thought, Kriyavada, Akriyavada, Ajnanikavada, and Vainayikavada, and their subgroups must have existed. Thus, philosophical Scepticism is thought to have appeared around this historic time frame. Jayatilleke tentatively places the Sceptics in the period 800-600 BCE.

== Jain account ==
=== Existence of dissent ===
According to Silanka, the Ajñāna claimed that the possibility of knowledge is doubtful since the claims to knowledge were mutually contradictory. Silanka quotes, "They posit the theory that since those who claim knowledge make mutually contradictory assertions, they cannot be stating the truth." Regarding Sceptic's point of view, Silanka in his commentary writes, as translated by Jayatilleke:

For they (i.e. the Sceptics) say that those who claim knowledge (jñaninah) cannot be stating actual facts since their statements are mutually contradictory, for even with regard to the category of the soul, some assert that the soul is omnipresent (sarvagatam) and other that it is not omnipresent (asarvagatam), some (say) it is of the size of a digit (angustaparvamatram) others that it is of the size of a kernel of a grain of millet (syamakatandulamatram) some say it both has form and is formless (murtamamurtam), some that it resides in the heart (hrdayamadhyavartinam) and (others) that it is located in the forehead (lalatavyavasthitam), etc. -- in respect of every category there is no uniformity in their assertion.

The conflicting theories of atman can be traced to Early Upanisads. The idea of atman "made of everything" (sarvamayah, idammayah adomayah) would be omnipresent (sarvagatam) (Brhadaranyaka Upanishad 4.4.5) while the transcendent atman defined negatively (Brhadaranyaka Upanishad 3.9.26) would not be so. Again at Katha Upanishad 2.3.17 the atman is of "the size of a digit", while at Chandogya Upanishad 3.14.3, the atman is "smaller than a kernel of a grain of millet". Again at Brhadaranyaka Upanishad 2.3.1, Brahman which is identical with the atman is said "both to have form and also be formless." Likewise at Katha Upanishad 2.3.17 the atman "resides in the heart" while at Aitareya Aranyaka 2.1.4.6 it is located in the head.

=== Impossibility of omniscience ===
In the same passage, Silanka continues:

There is no one with an outstanding intellect whose statements may be regarded as authoritative; even if such a person existed, he cannot be discovered by one with a limited vision according to the maxim that "one who is not omniscient does not know everything" for it is said "how can one desiring to know that a certain person is omniscient at a certain time do so if he is devoid of that person's intellect, his knowledge and his consciousness"; owing to the absence of the knowledge of the means, it cannot properly be accomplished; it cannot be accomplished because of the mutual dependence (of the two); for it is said "without a super-knowledge (visistaparijñana) the knowledge of the means is not attained and as a result there is no attainment of the super-knowledge of the object".

This criticism of omniscience seems to be directed at those teachers who claimed omniscience, or to their followers who later claimed them to be omniscient, specifically the Jain leaders and Purana Kassapa, and maybe later to Makkhali Gosala and the Buddha, on the basis of which they claimed to speak with authority. The dictum, that with a limited knowledge no one can know that any person is omniscient, may possibly be an old saying of the Sceptics; and they may have extended the idea to say that since human intellect was limited, no one could claim to know everything with such limited intellect. The passage may also be seen as an epistemology critique.

=== Relativity of knowledge ===
In the same passage, Silanka further continues:

Knowledge cannot completely comprehend the nature of the object of knowledge, for it is said, "whatever is apprehended should have the parts, near, middle and outer but here only the near part is apprehended and not the others since it is determined by it (i.e. the nature of the object)"; as for the exhausting the atom (paramanu-paryavasanata?) with the (knowledge of) the near portion, considering the unrepresented parts out of the three parts, it is not possible to apprehend the atom by those with a limited vision owing to the excellence of its nature; therefore, since there is no omniscient person and since one who is not omniscient cannot comprehend the nature of an object as it is constituted, since all the theorists (sarvavadinam) have conceived of the nature of the categories in a mutually contradictory manner and those who have claimed super-knowledge (uttarapari-jñaninam) are at fault (paramdavatam) Scepticism is best owing to the magnitude of the mistakes that arise (from claims of knowledge).

To the Sceptics, none of the contending theories, proposed by limited intellect, can be known to be true, since they are mutually contradictory. Also, any new theory may contradict existing theories, and hence cannot be true. Hence nothing can be known to be true. Thus the Sceptics conclude that the contradictions of metaphysics and the impossibility of omniscience lead them to accept Scepticism.

In a similar vein, the Sceptics held that

Scepticism is the best since it is difficult to gauge the thought process of another.

This may also be the reason why the Sceptics held to another dictum that

All teachings are like the utterances of barbarians since they have no (epistemic) basis.

Likewise, Silanka comments, "owing to the difficulty of knowing another's mind, they do not grasp what is intended by the words of their teacher and thus repeat the other's words like a barbarian without understanding the real meaning."

Regarding this passage and the maxims on knowledge, Jayatilleke compares the Sceptic's views with that of the Greek sophist Gorgias, as given in his book "Nature or the Non-existent," and proposes that the Sceptics may have arrived at their position using similar lines of reasoning. According to Jayatilleke's interpretation of the passage given by Silanka, perception is divided into near, middle, and outer, and we perceive only the near; so each person's view of what they see of an object will be different according their perspective. Since our knowledge depends on our individual perspective, the knowledge would be subjective since different people will have differing perspectives. In the absence of objectivity, there is no knowledge, and all private experiences of impressions of different individuals would be incommunicable.

=== Futility of knowledge ===
According to Silanka,

The Sceptics... conceive that even if there was knowledge it is useless (nisphalam) since it has many disadvantages (bahudosavat).

This quotation suggests that the Sceptics preferred scepticism not just on intellectual basis, but also for pragmatic or moral reasons. What these disadvantages are, Silanka does not elaborate, but can be found in the Buddhist sources. Regarding the futility of knowledge, Silanka puts these questions of the Sceptics:

Who knows that the soul exists? Of what use is this knowledge? Who knows that the soul does not exist? Of what use is this knowledge?

The Sutrakrtanga affirms that the Sceptics "teach final beatitude and final deliverance." Thus, the Sceptics may have contended that knowledge is not necessary for salvation but tapas, which seem similar to karmapatha.

=== Who knows? ===
Silanka in his commentary mentions sixty-seven types of Sceptics. However, these sixty-seven types are obtained combinatorially by taking nine categories (navapadartha) of Jainism, each with seven forms of predication (saptabhangakah), to give sixty-three (9 × 7) forms of sceptical questions, which were considered to represent sixty-three "types" of Sceptics asking these questions. The last four "types" were added to complete the list of sixty-seven types. However, according to Jayatilleke, these last four "types" may represent the kind of questions the Sceptics themselves might have asked. The last four questions are:

1. Who knows whether there is an arising of psychological states?
2. Who knows whether there is no arising of psychological states?
3. Who knows whether there is and is no arising of psychological states?
4. Who knows whether the arising of psychological states is impredicable?

Such psychological speculations seem to be rife during this era, as evinced in Pali Nikayas, especially the Potthapada Sutta.

== Buddhist account ==
In the Pali texts, the Sceptics are called Amarāvikkhepikas, which translates as "eel-wrigglers." Jayatilleke notes that it was probably a nickname, linked with vacavikkhepa ("verbal jugglery"), used by opponents for sceptics who avoided commitment to the truth or falsity of propositions. They are collectively spoken of as "some recluse and brahmins who wriggle like eels. For when a question is put to them on this or that matter, they resort to verbal jugglery and eel-wriggling on four grounds." The Brahmajala Sutta describes four schools of Scepticism. The first three of advocated Scepticism on the basis of fear of falsehood (musavadabhaya), fear of involvement (upadanabhaya), and fear of interrogation in debate (anuyogabhaya), respectively. While these three schools seem to have valued mental equanimity, the fourth school, associated with the philosopher Sanjaya Belatthiputta, appears to have had a different basis for its scepticism. A notable commonality among all these schools is the arrangement of propositions according to five-fold logic, alongside the usual two-fold mode and the four-fold mode (catuṣkoṭi) common in Pali Nikayas. The fifth mode is the denial of denials, that is, the rejection of the dialectician's view.

=== First school ===
The first school is described in the Brahmajala Sutta:

Herein a certain recluse or brahmin does not understand, as it really is, that this is good or this is evil. And it occurs to him: I do not understand what is good or evil as it really is. Not understanding what is good or evil, as it really is, if I were to assert that this is good and this is evil, that will be due to my likes, desires, aversions, or resentments. If it were due to my likes, desires, aversions or resentments, it would be wrong. And if I were wrong, it would cause me worry (vighato) and worry would be a moral danger to me (antarayo). Thus, through fear of being wrong (musavadabhaya) and the abhorrence of being wrong, he does not assert anything to be good or evil and on questions being put to him on this or that matter he resorts to verbal jugglery and eel-wriggling, saying: I do not say so, I do not say thus, I do not say otherwise, I do not say no, I deny the denials. (literally, I do not say "no, no").

In the absence of adequate information, the Sceptics prudently recommend suspension of judgement. The Sceptics felt that it was not just intellectually dishonest, but also morally dangerous not to do so. However, according to Jayatilleke, this was probably not a temporary suspension of judgement, until new information could come by to make a better evaluation; but rather it was meant to be a permanent state of affair by outright denying the very possibility of knowledge, and hence of questions regarding morality. Thus, their Scepticism is motivated by both intellectual as well as moral reasoning (i.e. fear of asserting falsehood due to one's prejudices). They seem to have contended that knowledge was not necessary for salvation but for karma-patha.

=== Second School ===
The second school of Sceptics is described in Brahmajala Sutta in similar terms as the first, except that for them to be led to believe in a proposition by one's likes, desires, aversions, and resentments would be entanglement (upadanam), and such entanglement would be a source of worry (vighato) and as such a moral danger (antarayo).

According to Jayatilleke, this group adopted Scepticism mainly due to morality, since to do so otherwise would lead to worry and mental disquietude (vighata), and not necessarily due to the considerations of rebirth, as understood according to the Buddhist connotation of the word "entanglement".

=== Third School ===
In Brahmajala Sutta, the third school of Scepticism is shown to put forward such arguments in support for their view point:

I do not know, as it really is, what is good and what is evil and not knowing, if I were to pronounce that this is good or this is evil, then I would have to join issue, argue and debate with recluses and brahmins, learned, subtle, hair-splitters, skilled in controversy, who go about debunking with their intellect the theories of others. If I were to join issue, argue and debate with them, I would no be able to explain to them. If I were unable to explain to them, that would cause me worry (vighata) and be moral danger (antarayo). Thus because he fears and detests interrogation (anuyoga) he does not "pronounce this to be good nor that to be evil."

According to Jayatilleke, it is not clear from this passage if they wished to avoid debate because they were Sceptics or whether they adopted Scepticism because they wanted to avoid debate. According to him, it is probable that "they would have seen no point in debate since one was nowhere nearer the truth at the end of it and at the same time feared debate because it could result in loss of their mental equanimity with they valued."

=== Fourth School ===
The fourth school of Scepticism described in Brahmajala Sutta is associated with Sanjaya Belatthiputta, whose views are also recorded in the Samaññaphala Sutta, since identical language is used to describe them. Sanjaya is described as a contemporary of the Buddha, as a well-known and celebrated teacher, and as a leader of a sect who was held in high esteem by the common folk. He is said to have taught Sariputta and Moggallana, before their conversion to Buddhism.

In Brahmajala Sutta, this fourth school of Sceptics is described as thus:

Herein a certain recluse or brahmin is dull, stupid. And by reason of his dullness and stupidity, when questioned on this or that matter, he resorts to verbal jugglery or eel-wriggling: "If you ask me whether there is a next world, then if it were to occur to me (iti ce me assa) that there is a next world, I would pronounce that there is a next world. Yet, I do not say so, I do not say thus, I do not say otherwise, I do not say no, I deny the denials. Similarly with regard to the propositions, "there is no next world", "there is and is not a next world", "there neither is nor is not a next world", "there are beings who survive (death)", "there are no beings who survive", "there are and are no beings who survive", "there neither are nor are there no beings who survive", "there is a result and a consequence of good and evil actions", "there is no result or consequence of good or evil actions", "the Perfect One (Tathagato) exists after death", "the Perfect One does not exist after death", "the Perfect One both exists and does not exist after death", "the Perfect One neither exists nor does not exist after death""

A similar account is given in the Samaññaphala Sutta. In both the accounts, the stupidity of this school is emphasised, highlighting the antipathy that the Buddhists felt about this school. In the Brahmajala Sutta, out of sixty-two philosophical schools mentioned, this school is singled out as being "a product of sheer stupidity;" whereas in the Samaññaphala Sutta, Ajatasattu singles out Sanjaya as "the most foolish and stupid."

Notable in this account of the fourth school of Scepticism is the lack of concern for good life and peace of mind, which the previous three schools regarded as desirable, and hence their advocacy of scepticism. Jayatilleke states that Sanjaya may have been a more thorough-going sceptic, to the point of being sceptical about a sceptic's way of life, and as such might have been a more vocal critic of his opponents and their regard for mental tranquillity, valued by the Buddhists as well. Judging by the propositions listed, Sanjaya's scepticism seems to have encompassed both metaphysics and morality. Sanjaya seems to grant the possibility of their truth, while denying the possibility of knowing this.

== Criticisms ==
The Jains criticised the Sceptics by pointing out that their scepticism should lead them to the conclusion that they know nothing whatsoever, yet they assert the knowledge of their scepticism and claim to know such propositions as "ignorance is best". Silanka criticises the Sceptics' belief that one cannot know what is on another's mind, saying "the inner mind of another can be apprehended by his external features, gestures, movements, gait, speech and the changes in his eyes and face."

== Influence ==
Although criticised by the Buddhists as amarāvikkhepikā (eel-wrigglers) in the Pali canon, the Buddha is depicted negating various the four-fold logical alternatives or catuṣkoṭi when posed with metaphysical questions, which is similar to the logic employed by the Ajñānins. However, all four schools of Ajñānins arrange their logic as five-fold formula, which seems to be based on the acceptance of the four-fold formula. This may mean that such logical schema was a common feature of the pre-Buddhist era. Alternatively, since there is no known school of Indian thinkers apart from the Buddhist who adopted a four-fold logical schema, and since all Sceptical schools are depicted to have the five-fold formula of denial, which seems to be based on the acceptance of a four-fold form of predication, this may suggest the four-fold schema to be the Buddhist invention. Indeed, two of the foremost disciples of Buddha, Sariputta and Moggallāna, were initially the students of Sanjaya; and a strong element of skepticism is found in early Buddhism, most particularly in the Aṭṭhakavagga sutra. The catuṣkoṭi was later used as a tool by Nagarjuna to formulate his influential brand of Madhyamaka philosophy. Since skepticism is a philosophical attitude and a style of philosophising rather than a position, the Ajñānins may have influenced other skeptical thinkers of India like Nagarjuna, Jayarāśi Bhaṭṭa, and Shriharsha.

According to Diogenes Laërtius, the Greek philosopher Pyrrho developed his skeptical philosophy in India when Pyrrho was there during the conquest of Alexander the Great. Based on the so-called "Aristocles passage," Jayatilleke draws many similarities between Pyrrhonist philosophy and the Indian philosophies current at the time. In particular, he lists the following:

(1) There were no beliefs or opinions which were true or false and therefore (2) we should give no positive answer to any of the logical alternatives. It would also be seen that (3) the four logical alternatives mentioned in Timon's account (i.e. is, is not, both is and is not, neither is nor is not) are identical with that of Sanjaya, the Buddhists, and perhaps also of the three schools of Sceptics... Lastly (4) the value of the sceptical attitude is said by Pyrrho to lie in the fact that it promotes speechlessness (aphasia) and mental imperturbability (ataraxia).

Scholars including Barua, Jayatilleke, and Flintoff, contend that Pyrrho was influenced by, or at the very least agreed with, Indian scepticism rather than Buddhism or Jainism, based on the fact that he valued ataraxia, which can be translated as "freedom from worry". Jayatilleke, in particular, contends that Pyrrho may have been influenced by the first three schools of Ajñāna, since they too valued freedom from worry. If this is true, then the methods of the Ajñānins may be preserved in the extant work by the Pyrrhonist philosopher Sextus Empiricus.

== See also ==
- Āstika and nāstika
- Ājīvika
- Charvaka
- Philosophical skepticism
- Śramaṇa

== Sources ==
- Barua, Benimadhab (1921). A History of Pre-Buddhistic Indian Philosophy (1st ed.). London: University of Calcutta. p. 468.
- Flintoff, Everard (1980). "Pyrrho and India". Phronesis. 25 (1). Brill: 88–108. doi:10.1163/156852880X00052. JSTOR 4182084.
- Jayatilleke, K.N. (1963). Early Buddhist Theory of Knowledge (PDF) (1st ed.). London: George Allen & Unwin Ltd. p. 524. Archived from the original (PDF) on September 11, 2015.
- Matilal, B.K. (2004). "Scepticism". Logical and Ethical Issues: An Essays on Indian Philosophy of Religion (2nd ed.). India: Orient Blackswan. pp. 52–75. ISBN 9788180280115.
- Warder, Anthony K. (1998). "Lokayata, Ajivaka, and Ajnana Philosophy". A Course in Indian Philosophy (2nd ed.). Delhi: Motilal Banarsidass Publishers. pp. 32–44. ISBN 9788120812444.
- "classicpersuasion.org". www.classicpersuasion.org. Archived from the original on 2016-03-04.
