= Ajita Kesakambali =

6th century BCE Indian materialist philosopher

- Born: 6th century BCE

Philosophical work
- Era: Sramana Movement
- Region: Indian philosophy
- School: Charvaka
- Notable ideas: Ucchedavada (the Doctrine of Annihilation after death); Tam-Jivam-tam-sariram-vada (the doctrine of identity of the soul and body)

Ajita Kesakambali (Sanskrit: अजित केशकंबली; Chinese: 阿耆多翅舍欽婆羅; pinyin: Āqíduō Chìshěqīnpóluó) was an ancient Indian philosopher in the 6th century BC.He is regarded as an early proponent of Indian materialism and is often associated with the intellectual traditions that preceded the Charvaka school. He was probably a contemporary of the Buddha and Mahavira. It has frequently been noted that the doctrines of the Lokayata school were considerably drawn from Ajita's teachings.

== Philosophy ==
Views of the six heretical teachers
- The views of six śramaṇa in the Pāli Canon, known as the six heretical teachers, based on the Sāmaññaphala Sutta.

Pūraṇa Kassapa
- Amoralism (akiriyavāda; natthikavāda): There is no reward or punishment for either good or bad deeds.

Makkhali Gośāla (Ājīvika)
- Fatalism (ahetukavāda; niyativāda): We are powerless; suffering is pre-destined.

Ajita Kesakambalī (Charvaka)
- Materialism (ucchedavāda; natthikavāda): Live happily; with death, all is annihilated.

Pakudha Kaccāyana
- Eternalism and categoricalism (sassatavāda; sattakāyavāda): Matter, pleasure, pain and the soul are eternal and do not interact.

Nigaṇṭha Ñāṭaputta (Jainism)
- Restraint (mahāvrata): Be endowed with, cleansed by, and suffused with [merely] the avoidance of all evil.

Sañjaya Belaṭṭhiputta (Ajñana)
- Agnosticism (amarāvikkhepavāda): "I don't think so. I don't think in that way or otherwise. I don't think not or not not." Suspension of judgement.

Like those of Lokayatins, nothing survives of Ajita's teachings in script, except some scattered references made by his opponents for the sake of refutation. Thus, Ajita Kesakambali's philosophical views are known primarily through accounts preserved in Buddhist and Jain literature, as no original writings attributed to him are known to survive.

=== From Buddhist sources ===
According to a Buddhist legend, Ajita wore a blanket of human hair (Kesakambali in Sanskrit means "with the hair blanket"), "which is described as being the most miserable garment. It was cold in cold weather, and hot in the hot, foul smelling and uncouth". Ajita means "unconquered", which implies that he was very argumentative.

According to early Buddhist sources, Ajita Kesakambali argued that:

There is no such thing as alms or sacrifice or offering. There is neither fruit nor result of good or evil deeds. A human being is built up of four elements. When he dies the earthly in him returns and relapses to the earth, the fluid to the water, the heat to the fire, the wind to the air, and his faculties pass into space. The four bearers, on the bier as a fifth, take his dead body away; till they reach the burning ground, men utter forth eulogies, but there his bones are bleached, and his offerings end in ashes. It is a doctrine of fools, this talk of gifts. It is an empty lie, mere idle talk, when men say there is profit herein. Fools and wise alike, on the dissolution of the body, are cut off, annihilated, and after death they are not.

According to the Brahmajala Sutta, Ajita propounded Ucchedavada (the Doctrine of Annihilation after death) and Tam-Jivam-tam-sariram-vada (the doctrine of identity of the soul and body), which denied the separate existence of an eternal soul. The extent to which these doctrines, which were evidently inherited by Lokayata, were found contemptible and necessary to be refuted in the idealist, theist and religious literature of the time is a possible evidence of their popularity.

=== Modern Marxist interpretations ===
D. D. Kosambi, who elsewhere calls Ajita a proto-materialist, notes that he "preached a thoroughgoing materialist doctrine: good deeds and charity gained a man nothing in the end. His body dissolved into the primary elements at death, no matter what he had or had not done. Nothing remained. Good and evil, charity and compassion were all irrelevant to a man's fate."

== See also ==
- Ajivika
- Ajñana
- Makkhali Gosala
- Pakudha Kaccayana
- Purana Kassapa
- Shramana
