= Samaññaphala Sutta =

2nd Sutta in the Digha Nikaya, Pāli Canon

The Samaññaphala Sutta ("The Fruit of Contemplative Life") is the second discourse (Pali, sutta; Skt., sutra) of the Digha Nikaya.

In terms of narrative, this discourse tells the story of King Ajātasattu, son and successor of King Bimbisara of Magadha, who posed the following question to many leading Indian spiritual teachers: What is the benefit of living a contemplative life? After being dissatisfied with the answers provided by these other teachers, the king posed this question to the Buddha whose answer motivated the king to become a lay follower of the Buddha.

In terms of Indian philosophy and spiritual doctrines, this discourse:

- provides the Buddha's own description of the lifestyle, mental, psychic and spiritual benefits ("fruit") of the Buddhist contemplative life;
- provides one of the most detailed accounts in the Sutta Pitaka of the Buddhist community's code of ethical behavior;
- describes from the Buddhist standpoint the essence of the teachings of several leading spiritual guides in the Buddha's time (see the table below for more details); and,
- through the narrative of King Ajātasattu's confessed transgression and his subsequent psychic unrest, paranoia and karmic impediments, the narrative illustrates Buddhist notions of merit and kamma in juxtaposition to those associated with other contemporaneous teachers (who, for instance, are depicted as advocating views of amorality, fatalism, materialism, eternalism and agnosticism).

Thanissaro Bhikkhu refers to this discourse as "one of the masterpieces of the Pali canon."

== Content ==
=== The king's unrest ===
Upon a bright uposatha night, King Ajātasattu, monarch of Magadha Kingdom, who was in the mood to hear a Dhamma discourse, asked his ministers if there was any worthy teacher "who might enlighten and bring peace to our mind." The ministers in turn suggested that the monarch visited a variety of teachers, all of whom the King rejected by being silent. But when the King's physician, Jivaka, who was silent all the time, was asked if he could suggest a teacher to visit, the physician quickly replied that the Buddha was currently staying in the physician's mango groves.

The King immediately agreed to go there. After preparing the elephants and his followers, the King rode to the mango groves. Yet, upon arriving on the Groves, the King was suddenly overcome with worry and doubt. The hairs on his body even stood up as he felt an agonizing fear. He asked his physician nervously and suspiciously, "Are you not deceiving me, Jivaka? Do you not betray me and hand my life to the enemies? How come it happens that there is not a single sound heard at all, not even coughs or sneezes in the huge group of 1,250 Sangha monks?"

To answer his majesty's paranoia, the physician calmly reassured the monarch, "Do not worry, your Majesty. I am not lying, or deceiving, or betraying you to your enemies. Proceed on, your Majesty! There, in the Hall, where the lights are lit."

The King proceeded and when he entered the Hall, he had difficulty in spotting where the Buddha was. To his king's aid, Jivaka answered that the Buddha was sitting on the back of a pillar, surrounded by his disciples.

The King then approached the Buddha and gave his salutation. Then, while standing, he saw how the Monks sat in silence, calm like a still, waveless lake. He exclaimed: "Can my beloved son, Udayi Bhadda, possess such calmness and composure as the Monks show me now?"

The Buddha asked him, "If so, Your Majesty, how do you direct your mind towards compassion and love?"

"Bhante, I love my son very dearly, and I wish for him to possess the calmness as like the monks have now." The Monarch then prostrated himself towards the Buddha, clasped his palms in salutation to the monks, and then proceeded to sit on the Buddha's side. The monarch then asked, "If my teacher doesn't mind, may I ask you a question?"

"Ask what you want to ask, King."

=== The king's questioning of six ascetics ===
Views of the six heretical teachers
- The views of six śramaṇa in the Pāli Canon, known as the six heretical teachers, based on the Sāmaññaphala Sutta.

Pūraṇa Kassapa
- Amoralism (akiriyavāda; natthikavāda): There is no reward or punishment for either good or bad deeds.

Makkhali Gośāla (Ājīvika)
- Fatalism (ahetukavāda; niyativāda): We are powerless; suffering is pre-destined.

Ajita Kesakambalī (Charvaka)
- Materialism (ucchedavāda; natthikavāda): Live happily; with death, all is annihilated.

Pakudha Kaccāyana
- Eternalism and categoricalism (sassatavāda; sattakāyavāda): Matter, pleasure, pain and the soul are eternal and do not interact.

Nigaṇṭha Ñāṭaputta (Jainism)
- Restraint (mahāvrata): Be endowed with, cleansed by, and suffused with [merely] the avoidance of all evil.

Sañjaya Belaṭṭhiputta (Ajñana)
- Agnosticism (amarāvikkhepavāda): "I don't think so. I don't think in that way or otherwise. I don't think not or not not." Suspension of judgement.

The King asks, "Bhante (Teacher), there are a number of skills and talents, such as: elephant-drivers, chariot-drivers, horse riders, archers, palanquin bearers, army commander's adjutants, royal officers, soldiers, warriors with elephant's courage, heroes, fighters, troops in deer-skin uniform, slaves, cooks and chefs, barbers, bathers, bakers, florists, launderers, weavers, crafters, potters, mathematicians, accountants, and many other skills. In their current life, they enjoy the real fruits of their skills. They support their life, their family, parents, and friends with their skills in happiness and welfare. They donate high-valued gifts and offerings to the Brahmins and the ascetics, giving them rewards of a joyful next life in heaven, and other joys. Can the Bhante instruct me in what are the real benefits of a contemplative life in this current life?"

The Buddha then replied, "Your Majesty, have you ever asked this question to any other teachers, brahmins, or ascetics?"

The King replied by repeating what each of six revered ascetic teachers allegedly told him. (These responses are summarized in the adjacent table.) The king found each of these answers to be dissatisfying: "Just as if a person, when asked about a mango, were to answer with a breadfruit; or, when asked about a breadfruit, were to answer with a mango."

=== The Buddhist fruit of the contemplative life ===
The Buddha then elaborated on his perspective regarding the benefits of the contemplative life, moving from the material to the spiritual:

- Solitude's delight: For instance, for slaves and farmers, freedom from servitude resulting in being "content with the simplest food and shelter, delighting in solitude" as well as the veneration of others.
- Virtue's pleasure: "[T]he monk ... consummate in virtue sees no danger anywhere from his restraint through virtue. Endowed with this noble aggregate of virtue, he is inwardly sensitive to the pleasure of being blameless."
- Simplicity's contentment: "Wherever he goes, he takes only his barest necessities along. This is how a monk is content."
- Mental calm: With mindfulness and alertness (see sampajanna), a monk cleanses his mind of covetousness, ill will and anger, sloth and drowsiness, restlessness and anxiety, and doubt (see the Five Hindrances).
- Jhanic bliss: He attains the four jhanic states which are associated with the permeating of his body with rapture, pleasure, equanimity, and a pure, bright awareness.
- Insight knowledge: "[W]ith his mind thus concentrated, purified, and bright, unblemished, free from defects, pliant, malleable, steady, and attained to imperturbability — the monk directs and inclines it to knowledge and vision. He discerns: 'This body of mine is endowed with form, composed of the four primary elements, born from mother and father, nourished with rice and porridge, subject to inconstancy, rubbing, pressing, dissolution, and dispersion. And this consciousness of mine is supported here and bound up here.'"
- Supernatural powers: "Having been one he becomes many; having been many he becomes one. He appears. He vanishes. He goes unimpeded through walls, ramparts, and mountains as if through space. He dives in and out of the earth as if it were water. He walks on water without sinking as if it were dry land. Sitting cross-legged he flies through the air like a winged bird. With his hand he touches and strokes even the sun and moon, so mighty and powerful.... He hears — by means of the divine ear-element, purified and surpassing the human — both kinds of sounds: divine and human, whether near or far."
- Mind reading: He can discern in others states of consciousness such as those with or without passion, lust, delusion, concentration, etc. (see the Satipatthana Sutta regarding mindfulness of the mind).
- Three knowledges: He can recollect past lives, see the rebirth of other beings, and knows the ending of suffering and the fermentations of sensuality, becoming and ignorance.
- Release from samsara: "His heart, thus knowing, thus seeing, is released from the fermentation of sensuality, the fermentation of becoming, the fermentation of ignorance. With release, there is the knowledge, 'Released.' He discerns that 'Birth is ended, the holy life fulfilled, the task done. There is nothing further for this world.'"

Upon hearing the Buddha's explanation, King Ajātasattu declared himself a lay follower of the Buddha.

=== The king's patricide and its karmic consequences ===
The king then confessed that he himself had killed his own father so as to become king. The Buddha replied:

"Yes, great king, a transgression overcame you in that you were so foolish, so muddle-headed, and so unskilled as to kill your father — a righteous man, a righteous king — for the sake of sovereign rulership. But because you see your transgression as such and make amends in accordance with the Dhamma, we accept your confession. For it is a cause of growth in the Dhamma & Discipline of the noble ones when, seeing a transgression as such, one makes amends in accordance with the Dhamma and exercises restraint in the future."

The Buddha subsequently declared: "... Had [King Ajātasattu] not killed his father [King Bimbisara] — that righteous man, that righteous king — the dustless, stainless Dhamma eye would have arisen to him as he sat in this very seat."

== Commentaries ==
- Bodhi, Bhikkhu (1997). Discourse on the Fruits of Recluseship. Buddhist Publication Society. ISBN 978-955-24-0045-2.
- Khema, Ayya (2001). Visible Here and Now: The Buddha's Teachings on the Rewards of Spiritual Practice. Shambhala Publications. ISBN 9781570624926.

== See also ==
- Pāli Canon
- Sutta Piṭaka
- Digha Nikāya
- Gradual Training (Buddhism)
- Dhammacakkappavattana Sutta
- Mahāparinibbāṇa Sutta

== Bibliography ==
- Ñāṇamoli, Bhikkhu (trans.) and Bodhi, Bhikkhu (ed.) (2001). The Middle-Length Discourses of the Buddha: A Translation of the Majjhima Nikāya. Boston: Wisdom Publications. ISBN 0-86171-072-X.
- Thanissaro Bhikkhu (trans.) (1997). Samaññaphala Sutta: The Fruits of the Contemplative Life (DN 2).
- Walshe, Maurice O'Connell (trans.) (1995). The Long Discourses of the Buddha: A Translation of the Dīgha Nikāya. Somerville: Wisdom Publications. ISBN 0-86171-103-3.
