= Lohicca Sutta =

12th Sutta in the Digha Nikaya, Pāli Canon

The Lohicca Sutta is the 12th Buddhist discourse of the Digha Nikaya, one of the collections in Sutta Pitaka of Pāli Canon.

== Content ==
The Sutta is a dialogue between a brahmin named Lohicca and Lord Buddha about the ethics of teaching.

== Name of Lohicca ==
The name of Lohicca only twice appears in early Pali texts: the (Sálávatiká) Lohicca Sutta (DN 12) and the (Makkarakaṭa) Lohicca Sutta (S 35.132).
