= Makkhali Gosala =

Ascetic teacher of ancient India

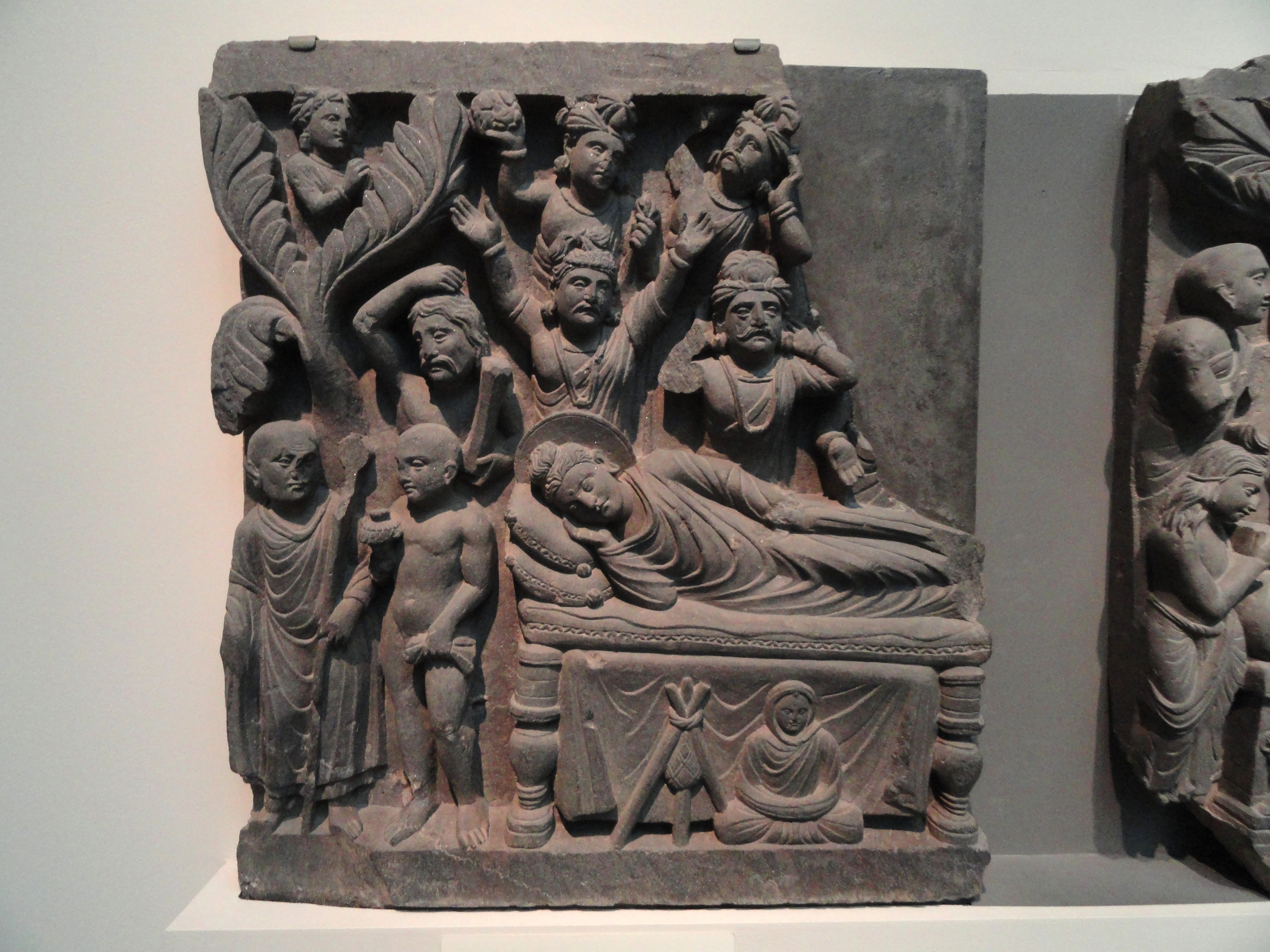
- On the left: Mahakashyapa meets an Ajivika and learns of the Parinirvana

Religious life
- Religion: Founder of Ajivika

Views of the six heretical teachers
- The views of six śramaṇa in the Pāli Canon, known as the six heretical teachers, based on the Sāmaññaphala Sutta.

Pūraṇa Kassapa
- Amoralism (akiriyavāda; natthikavāda): There is no reward or punishment for either good or bad deeds.

Makkhali Gośāla (Ājīvika)
- Fatalism (ahetukavāda; niyativāda): We are powerless; suffering is pre-destined.

Ajita Kesakambalī (Charvaka)
- Materialism (ucchedavāda; natthikavāda): Live happily; with death, all is annihilated.

Pakudha Kaccāyana
- Eternalism and categoricalism (sassatavāda; sattakāyavāda): Matter, pleasure, pain and the soul are eternal and do not interact.

Nigaṇṭha Ñāṭaputta (Jainism)
- Restraint (mahāvrata): Be endowed with, cleansed by, and suffused with [merely] the avoidance of all evil.

Sañjaya Belaṭṭhiputta (Ajñana)
- Agnosticism (amarāvikkhepavāda): "I don't think so. I don't think in that way or otherwise. I don't think not or not not." Suspension of judgement.

Makkhali Gosala (Pāli; BHS: Maskarin Gośāla; Jain Prakrit sources: Gosala Mankhaliputta) or Manthaliputra Goshalak (6th or 5th century BCE) was an ascetic ajivika teacher of ancient India. He was a contemporary of Gautama Buddha, the founder of Buddhism, and of Mahavira, the last and 24th Tirthankara of Jainism.

== Sources ==
Details about Gosala's life are sparse. All of the available information about Gosala and about the Ājīvika movement generally comes from Buddhist and Jain sources. As Gosala's teachings appear to have been rivals of those of the Buddhist and Jain leaders of his day, this information is regarded by most scholars as being overtly influenced and coloured by sectarian hostilities.

Two primary sources describe Gosala's life and teaching: the Jain Bhagavati Sutra, and Buddhaghosa's commentary on the Buddhist Sāmmaññaphala Sutta. The Bhagavati Sutra goes into detail about the career of Makkhali Gosala and his relationship with Mahavira; the Sāmmaññaphala Sutta itself mentions Makkhali in passing as one of six leading teachers of philosophy of the Buddha's day, and Buddhaghosa's commentary provides additional details about his life and teaching.

With regards to his early years, it is related in the Bhagavati that he was born in the settlement Saravana, in the vicinity apparently of the city of Savatthi (Shravasti, Uttar Pradesh). He came of low parentage. His father was a Mankhali, i.e. a mendicant who earned his livelihood by showing a picture which he carried in his hand. Once on his wanderings Mankhali came to Saravana and failing to obtain any other shelter, he took refuge for the rainy season in the cowshed (Gosala) of a wealthy Brahman Gobahula, where his wife Bhadda brought forth a son who became famous as Gosala Mankhaliputta. When grown up, he too became a Mankhali. In his wanderings, Gosala happened to meet the young ascetic Mahavira in Nalanda.

The name 'Gosala' literally means 'cow shed', and both the Bhagavati Sutra and Buddhaghosa claim that Gosala was so named because he was born in a cow shed, his parents being unable to find more suitable lodgings in the village of Saravana. The Bhagavati Sutra reports that Gosala went on to follow his father's profession, becoming a mankha. Meanwhile, Buddhaghosa claims that Gosala was born into slavery, and became a naked ascetic after fleeing from his irate master, who managed to grab hold of Gosala's garment and disrobe him as he fled. While it is possible that the broad outlines of Gosala's birth story or early life are correct—that he was born into poverty in a cowshed—it may be equally likely that these versions of his early life were concocted by Buddhist and Jain partisans to bring a rival teacher into disrepute.

The philosopher's true name seems to have been Maskarin, the Jaina Prakrit form of which is Mankhali and the Pāli form Makkhali. "Maskarin" is explained by Pāninī (VI.i.154) as "one who carries a bamboo staff" (maskara). A Maskarin is also known as Ekadandin. According to Patañjali (Mahābhāsya iii.96), the name indicates a School of Wanderers who were called Maskarins, not so much because they carried a bamboo staff as because they taught "Don't perform actions, don't perform actions, quietism (alone) is desirable to you". The Maskarins were thus fatalists or determinists.

== Makkhali Gosala and Mahavira ==
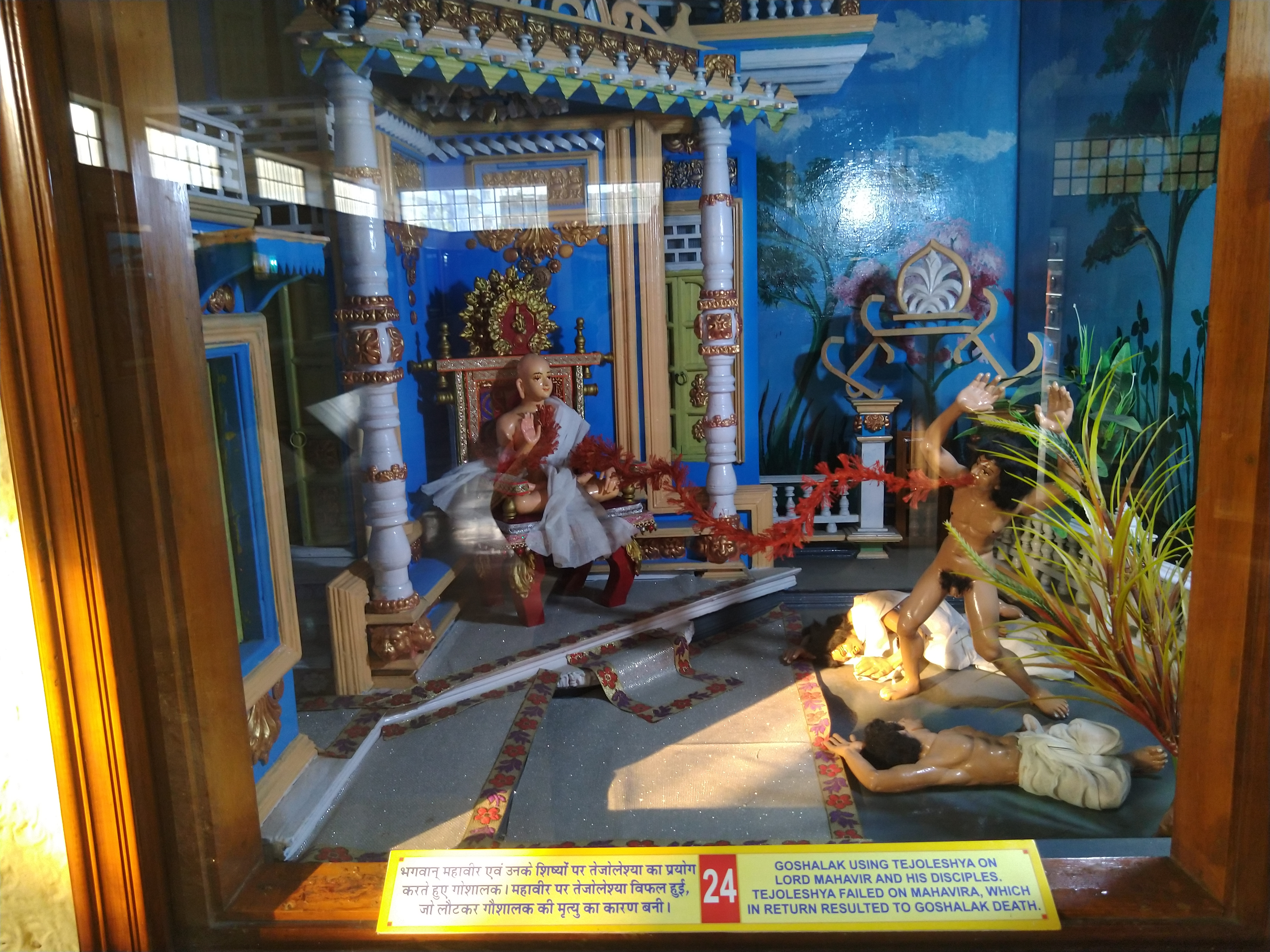
A diorama in Jain Museum, Madhuban, Giridih, depicting Gosala attacking Mahavira and his disciples

The Bhagavati Sutra states that Gosala became Mahavira's disciple three years after the start of Mahavira's asceticism, and travelled with him for the next six years. A commentary to the Jain Avasyaka Sutra provides details of these six years of association, many of them reflecting poorly on Gosala- another likely indication of sectarian bias. Several incidents in the narrative show Mahavira making predictions that then come true, despite Gosala's repeated attempts to foil them. These incidents were likely included in the narrative to provide motivation for Gosala's later belief in the inevitability of fate. Some of these incidents may in fact have been adapted from Ajivika sources but recast by Jaina chroniclers.

Another possible adaptation of an Ajivika story is found in Mahavira's explanation of the end of the association between himself and Gosala, recorded in the Bhagavati Sutra. On coming to a plant by the roadside, Gosala asked Mahavira what the fate of the plant and its seeds would be. Mahavira stated that the plant would grow to fruition, and the seed pods would grow into new plants. Determined to foil his master's prediction, Gosala returned to the plant at night and uprooted it. Later, a sudden rain shower caused the plant to revive and re-root itself. Upon approaching the plant again later, Gosala claimed to Mahavira that he would find his prophecy to have been foiled. Instead, it was found that the plant and its seeds had developed exactly as predicted by Mahavira. Gosala was so impressed by the reanimation of the plant that he became convinced that all living things were capable of such reanimation. The terms used in the story of the Bhagavati Sutra for reanimation mimic a technical term for reanimation of the dead that is also found elsewhere in Ajivika doctrine. Mahavira disagreed with this thesis, and this seems to have been the cause of the separation of the two ascetics. Mahavira is, however, later depicted as having rescued Gosala from an attack by an enraged renunciant using magical powers acquired through the practice of austerities; this is claimed to motivate Gosala's pursuit of the same sort of magical powers.

== Death ==
A. L. Basham dates the death of Gosala in 484 BCE on the basis of Mahavamsa.

== In literature ==
Gosala appears briefly as a "cameo" character in the 1981 Gore Vidal novel Creation, a fictional account of the Persian Wars of the 5th century BCE, told from the perspective of a widely travelled Persian diplomat, Cyrus Spitama, who is depicted as the grandson of Zoroaster and boyhood friend of Xerxes I. In early adulthood, thanks to his facility with languages, Cyrus is appointed by King Darius I as the Persian ambassador to the kingdoms of India. While travelling across the Subcontinent, Cyrus stops at the city of Mathura, where he is accosted by the Jain sage, who lectures Cyrus about his views on the inevitability of fate, and his disagreements with Mahavira.

Khanti Kikatia is a novel focused on the life of Makkhali Gosala, written by Ashwini Kumar Pankaj in the Magahi language.
