= Akriyavada =

Akriyavada is the doctrine, considered heretical by Buddhists, that moral acts do not have any consequences. This belief was taught by many of the Buddha's contemporaries, but since it contradicts belief in karma it was denounced by the Buddha. His own teachings are considered kiriyavada. Akriya means – inactive, without action of any kind.
