= Mahāparinibbāna Sutta =

Sutta narrating the Mahaparinibbana of Gautama Buddha

The Mahāparinibbāna Sutta is Sutta 16 in the Dīgha Nikāya, a scripture belonging to the Sutta Piṭaka of Theravāda Buddhism. It concerns the end of Gautama Buddha's life - his parinibbāna - and is the longest sutta of the Pāli Canon. Because of its attention to detail, it has been resorted to as the principal source of reference in most standard accounts of the Buddha's death.

== Content ==
The sutta begins a few days before the rainy retreat when Vassakara, the minister, visited the Buddha in Rajgir on the initiative of Ajātasattu, a king of the Haryanka dynasty of Magadha. The narrative continues beyond the three months of the rainy retreat and records the passing away of the Buddha, his cremation and the division of relics finally ending with the erection of eight cetiyas or monuments enshrining the relics of the Buddha. This shows the Indian origin of Buddhist funeral customs.

== Versions ==
There are numerous versions of the Mahāparinibbāna Sutta. Among them, the Pali version is of an early date in respect of language and contents. The Mahāparinibbāna Sutta is of utmost historical and cultural value and therefore it has become a sourcebook for students of Buddhism, Buddha biography and history of Buddhist thought and literature. Other versions of the text exist in Sanskrit, Tibetan and Chinese.

== Date of composition ==
On the basis of philological evidence, Indologist and Pali expert Oskar von Hinüber says that some of the Pali suttas have retained very archaic place-names, syntax, and historical data from close to the Buddha's lifetime, including the Mahāparinibbāna Sutta. Hinüber proposes a composition date of no later than 350–320 BCE for this text, which would allow for a "true historical memory" of the events approximately 60 years prior if the short chronology for the Buddha's lifetime is accepted (but also reminds us that such a text was originally intended more as hagiography than as an exact historical record of events).

The contents of narratives about the First Buddhist Council follow closely the narrative presented in the Mahāparinibbāna Sutta, leading scholars like Louis Finot and Erich Frauwallner to conclude that they originally formed a single continuous narrative. These narratives of the First Council and found in part or in whole in all six extant Vinaya traditions, whose organization and basic contents are believed by many scholars to stem from before the earliest schisms in the Buddhist Sangha. In some versions, the contents of the Sutta are included before the narrative of the First Council that ends the Skandhaka section of the Vinaya Pitakas. In other cases, the sutta narrative and the council narrative are divided between the Sutta Pitaka and Vinaya Pitaka.

== See also ==
- Pāli Canon
- Sutta Piṭaka
- Digha Nikāya
- Mahāyāna Mahāparinirvāṇa Sūtra

== Bibliography ==
- Buswell, Robert Jr; Lopez, Donald S. Jr., eds. (2013). "Mahāparinibbānasuttanta", in Princeton Dictionary of Buddhism. Princeton, NJ: Princeton University Press. pp. 502–504. ISBN 9780691157863.
- Rhys Davids, T. W. and C. A. F. trans. (1910). Dialogues of the Buddha, part II, Oxford University Press, pp. 78–191.
- von Hinüber, Oskar (2009). Cremated like a King: The Funeral of the Buddha within the Ancient Indian Cultural Context, Journal of the International College for Postgraduate Buddhist Studies 13, 33-66
- Walshe, Maurice, trans. (1987). “Mahaparinibbana Sutta: The Great Passing.” In Thus Have I Heard: The Long Discourses of the Buddha. London: Wisdom Publications.
