= Bhagchandra Jain =

Indian scholar (born 1936)

Bhagchandra (Bhaskar) Jain (born on 11 September 1936) is an Indian scholar, renowned for his deep knowledge of Jainism and Buddhism, and of classical Indian languages including Pali, Prakrit and Sanskrit. He holds Triple (3) Doctor of Literature(D.Litt.) in Sanskrit, Pali-Prakrit & Hindi. His career has spanned more than six decades. He is the recipient of the 2004 "Presidential Award" from President of India for his contribution to Pali-Prakrit languages and Buddhism & Jainism religions.

Bhagchandraji received his Ph.D. from Vidyodaya (University of Ceylon) in 1966. His dissertation was later published as Jainism in Buddhist Literature in 1972, which has since emerged as a major reference on the topic.

He has guided 30+ Scholars for their Ph.D. and D.Litt. Degrees. He delivered Lectures in 30+ International Conferences including International Religious Foundation (New York), Harvard University, Yale University & chaired over 100+ National conferences. He has been awarded more than 40+ Awards within India and also a few internationally for his Literary works.

He is also associated with a dedicated charitable trust, which supports educational institutions and economically disadvantaged students through scholarships and other philanthropic initiatives.

He was Head of Department of Pali and Prakrit at Nagpur University from 1965 to 1996, and he served as the director of Parshvanath Vidyapith at Varanasi from 1999 to 2001. He worked as a Professor Emeritus in JAIN Vishwabharti (Deemed University), Ladnun in Rajasthan. Previously, he worked at JRRS University, Jaipur as Professor & Head of Jain Philosophy as well. Currently, he is working as Hony Professor and Director, Sanmati Research Institute of Indology, Nagpur.

Mr. Bhagchandra Jain’s scholarly contributions include more than 113 books and 300+ research papers, and he has been a visiting Professor at universities in the United States, Canada, and Europe. He is a recipient of three Doctor of Literature (D.Litt.) degrees viz. D.Litt. (Sanskrit), D.Litt. (Pali – Prakrit) and D.Litt. (Hindi) which has not been achieved by anyone else in the world and is a world record. In addition, he is a holder of M.A. (Ancient Indian History, Culture, and Archaeology), M.A. (Pali), and M.A. (Sanskrit, Shastracharya (Prakrit and Jain Darshan), Acharya (Sanskrit Sahitya)). Bhagchandra has received several awards and honors, including the Presidential Certificate of Honour in Pali/Prakrit in 2004.

Mr. Bhagchandra Jain served as an editor of several periodicals including Jain Milan, Ratnatraya, Suddharma, Shramana, Nagpur University Journal, and Prachin Tirth Jirnoddhar; and has represented Jainism, Buddhism and Indology at World Religious Conferences (including Harvard University) and chaired the sessions in the U.S., U.K., Canada and European countries.

He is married to Dr. Pushpalata Jain, former head of the Department of Hindi at St. Francis de Sales College, Nagpur.
