= Brahmajāla Sutta =

Part of the Digha Nikaya, Pāli Canon

The Brahmajāla Sutta is the first of 34 sutta in the Dīgha Nikāya (the Long Discourses of the Buddha), the first of the five nikāya, or collections, in the Sutta Pitaka, which is one of the "three baskets" that compose the Pali Tipitaka of (Theravada) Buddhism. The name means Raft (jāla-made.of inflatable cow or buffalo skins tied to a wooden platform used to convey people from one shore to the other) of Brahmā. The sutta is also called Atthajala (Raft of Essence), Dhammajala, (Raft of the Dhamma), Ditthijala (Raft of Views), Anuttarasangama Vijaya (Incomparable Victory in Battle). The sutta discusses two main topics: the elaboration of the "Ten Precepts" (Cula-sila) and the "Middle Precepts" (Majjhima-sila). Cula-sila deals with the Ten Precepts to be practiced by devout Buddhists, while Majjhima-sila gives a detailed description of the practice of the sixth, seventh, eighth, and ninth precepts, together with a further delineation of virtuous practices and abstentions.

The second and third parts of the sutta discuss the 62 beliefs (ditthi) which are clung to by ascetics in India. These are divided into: 18 beliefs related to the past (pubbantanuditthino), and 44 beliefs about the future (aparantakappika).

Many of these beliefs are still relevant in the modern world and thus the sutta provides Buddhist scholars with much information to ponder about the Buddha's teachings.

The elaboration of these beliefs is very detailed, focusing on how the beliefs (faiths) come to be and the way they are described and declared. The elaboration ends with the Buddha's statement about the "danger of clinging to these beliefs", as they are still influenced by desire (lobha), hatred (dosa), and ignorance (avijjā) that its faithful followers will not end in the final liberation but still in the cycle of samsara. Believers of these faiths are compared to small fish in a pond which will be captured by a fine net no matter how much they want to escape, while those who see reality as it is are beyond the net of samsara.

== Beginning ==
The sutta starts with the Buddha travelling with his disciples between the cities of Rajagaha and Nalanda. At the same time, a Brahmin called Suppiya, with his young apprentice, Brahmadatta, were also travelling in the same direction, tailing the convoy of the sangha. Suppiya uttered some insulting words about the Buddha, his teachings, and his disciples. However, Brahmadatta praised and revered the Buddha, Dhamma, and Sangha. The two continued debating until they arrived at the King's resting place in Ambalatthika.

Hearing this conversation, some monks discussed the nature of conflicting students and teachers the next morning. They wondered how marvellous it was that the Buddha knew the various kinds of views to be found in people. The Buddha arrived and asked what they were discussing. As a monk finished telling him, the Buddha responded,

"Monks, if anyone spoke words which insult me, the Dhamma, and the Sangha, don't let this thing prompt you to hate, take revenge, and turn against them. If, because of this, you become angry or annoyed, then it will become an obstacle in your quest to liberate yourself, and cause you upset. However, if someone speaks insulting or false accusations about me, the Dhamma, and the Sangha, then you should state which is wrong and point out the mistake by explaining that because of this proof and that, then that is not true, or it is not like that, that kind of thing is not us, or occurring in us." "But if someone praises me, the Dhamma, or the Sangha; don't let this thing make you feel proud, joyful, and happy. If you act like that, then it will become an obstacle in your efforts to achieve your own final liberation. If someone speaks like that, you should state which is right and show the fact by saying, 'Based upon this and that fact, it is indeed so; that thing does indeed exist in us, or is true about us.' Even only due to small matters, worthless, or even due to the Precepts (Śīla)."

== Precepts ==
In the first part, the Buddha elaborates precepts that made people praise him or the Sangha as worthy of reverence. The list of the Buddha's higher precepts are categorized as follows:

=== Cula Sila ===
- 1. Abstain from taking another creature's life, weapons, violence.
- 2. Abstain from taking things which were not given.
- 3. Live soberly, piously, and honestly.
- 4. Abstain from sexual misconduct.
- 5. Abstain from lying.
- 6. Speak only the truth, believable and reliable, and never contradict his own words.
- 7. Abstain from slander.
- 8. Promote, speak, and love union (harmony) and not division (conflict).
- 9. Abstain from rough, insulting words.
- 10. Speak polite, likeable, exact, well chosen words that will make people's hearts joyful, not wasting time in idle gossip.
- 11. Discuss the Dhamma and the Vinaya at the right time.
- 12. Discuss in clear, detailed, and understandable words.

=== Majjhima Sila ===
- 13. Abstain from hurting seeds, plants, roots, branches, cheating, trading, slavery, forgery, bribery, and criminal conduct.
- 14. Abstain from hoarding food, drink, clothes (robes), bedding, perfume, spices, and other tools.
- 15. Take food once a day.
- 16. Abstain from watching shows (dances, exhibitions, matches, music performances, parades, etc.).
- 17. Abstain from playing games (card games, board games, dice games, games of chance, racing games, acrobatics, word games, etc.).
- 18. Abstain from using luxurious furniture and bedding.
- 19. Abstain from using cosmetics, make-up, and fancy or luxurious clothes (robes).
- 20. Abstain from discussing people, politicians, criminals, terrors, food and beverages, clothing, places, families, cities, wars and battles, heroes, ghosts, street rumors, speculation on how the world is created, or about existence and non-existence.
- 21. Abstain from accusing, denying, goading or challenging (e.g., 'I practised the Dhamma devoutly, but you don't!' or 'What you say is old rubbish!' or 'You are wrong!' or 'Free yourself if you can!').
- 22. Abstain from being the courier or messenger of politicians or higher administrations.
- 23. Abstain from deceiving lay people by uttering spells to exorcise demons or make someone's fortune, acting like a holy person by reciting mantras.

=== Maha Sila ===
- 24. Abstain from earning money from fortune-telling, divination, clairvoyance, exorcism, conjuring, magic tricks, spells, making false medicine and herbs, healing people through magic, leading/conducting ceremonies in order to gain something (wealth, fertility, etc.).

== Eighteen beliefs about the past ==
In the second part, the Buddha explains the major beliefs of ascetics in India. He begins by saying, "Monks, there are other things which are very deep (profound), very hard to understand, very difficult to perceive, so holy and sacred, unreached by means of mind, so subtle, that they are only to be understood and experienced by the wise. These things were perceived clearly, seen clearly and were discarded by the Tathagata, and by this act based on the truth that people praise and revered Tathagatha. What are those things?"

=== Eternalistic belief ===
Eternalism is described in the sutta as the belief which is based upon the past, and holds that the universe (loka) and the soul or self (attha) are eternal as a 'rock mountain or strong-fastened pole'. The world doesn't create new souls and therefore, the souls are living in an eternal cycle of death and rebirth, differing only in name, location, and time. These kind of beliefs have four origins:

- 1. Ascetics and Brahmins who have reached a high level of meditation; due to this achievement, they were able to remember from one to tens of thousands of their past lives.
- 2. Ascetics and Brahmins who have reached the spiritual achievements which provided them access to memories of one to ten iterations of the Earth's formation, evolution, and destruction.
- 3. Ascetics and Brahmins who have managed to recall the Earth's evolutionary process from ten to forty times.

The abovementioned ascetics and Brahmins recalled how they had name, family, heirs, food, joy and sadness, then death and rebirth in their past lives. Based on their experience, they concluded that the universe and the soul must be eternal.

- 4. Ascetics and Brahmins who use logic and inference and come to the conclusion that the soul and universe are eternal.

The Buddha said that there are 18 types of eternalistic belief, all based on one of these four origins. All of the followers of these beliefs defended and clung to their faith and did not give credence to other faiths.

=== Partial-eternalistic belief ===
The semi-eternalistic belief is described as belief that is based on the past, where the dualistic notion is asserted that there are things which are eternal and things which are not eternal. There are four ways these beliefs come to be faith, where one believer never acknowledged the other beliefs:

The Buddha told a story about a time when the Earth was not yet formed. The sentient beings in this time normally lived in the realm of Abhassara, in radiant light and nourished by celestial joy. Then came a time when the Earth was in the process of forming yet still uninhabitable. One of these beings in the Abhassara realm died (due to the exhaustion of his karma) and was reborn in the higher realm called the Brahma realm and lived alone in the palace there. From living alone for so long a time, this being grew distressed and longed for a companion.

He then uttered, "O, let it be that another being may come here and accompany me." At the same time as the utterance, a being in the Abhassara realm died (due to the exhaustion of his good karma) and was reborn in the Brahma realm as his follower, but in many ways, similar to his feature.

Seeing this happen, the Brahma being thought, "I am Brahma, Mahābrahmā, the Almighty, Omniscient, the Lord of All, Creator, Master of all creatures. I am the source of all life, Father to everything which exists and will come to exist. These creatures are my creations. How can I conclude this? Because, just as I was thinking, "Let it be that another being may come here and accompany me", then my wish made that being come into existence."

Beings that came after thought the same thing. They worshipped and revered the Brahma because, "He was here even before I existed! Surely he is the Lord and Creator of All." In the Brahma realm, the first being had longer and more powerful features than the latter coming beings. So, a probability existed that the latter being died in the Brahma realm, and then was reborn as a human. This human abandoned worldly affairs and became an ascetic, then by his devotion and practice, achieved the power to remember his one past life. As he recalled it, he came to the conclusion that creatures, including himself, are not eternal, had limited age, were vulnerable to change, but that Brahma is eternal, ageless, and changeless.

The second semi-eternalistic belief came from ascetics who were once Khiddapadosika gods, celestial beings that were too busy experiencing desire-based joy and fun and forgot to take their nutriments and therefore, died. As they were reborn as ascetics and achieved the ability to remember their past life, they came to a conclusion analogous to the 'Fall from Grace': "If only we were not so greedy and overzealous in our previous life, if only we had been able to control ourselves, we would not have suffered death. Now that we had made this error, we have to suffer this mortal life". Here, they concluded that the gods were eternal, and others were not.

The third semi-eternalistic belief came from the Manopadosika gods. These were the gods who always envied the other gods. This illness of mind caused their death. In the same cycle, they were reborn as ascetic Manopadosika gods, achieved the ability to remember their past life, and came to the conclusion, "Had we not been envious, we would have stayed strong and intelligent. We would never have died or fallen forever from the realm of gods.".

The fourth semi-eternalistic belief is based on logic and reflection. The people who embraced this belief concluded their faith based on their thoughts and logics as follow: "Here is what is called (atta) of eyes, nose, tongue, and our physical body, which are always changed. But, there is also atta of mind: the state of mind, awareness of 'atta', which is eternal.".

All of the followers of these beliefs defended and clung to their faith and didn't believe in other faiths.

=== The Universe (Doctrines of the Finitude and Infinity of the World) ===
The beliefs on the universe is based on the speculation about the infinite or the limited nature of the universe. There are four ways these beliefs were expressed:

- 1. The universe is infinite.
- 2. The universe is limited.
- 3. The universe is vertically limited but horizontally infinite.
- 4. The universe is neither limited nor infinite.

The source of these beliefs came from two reasons:

- 1. The frame of mind which formed these beliefs came from the object of focus of meditation taken by the ascetics who managed to reach a deep level of meditation and came to the conclusion that the world is infinite (if they used infinity as the object of meditation), or limited (if they imagined the object of their focus to be limited).
- 2. The people who used logic and thought and concluded that the world must be neither infinite nor limited.

All of the followers of these beliefs defended and clung to their faith and didn't believe in other faiths.

=== Ambiguous Evasion ===
The concept of ambiguous evasion or eel-wriggling (Pali: Amaravikkhepa) is introduced in the Brahmajala sutta. When hearing Buddhist teachings, the Buddha claims that people would react with four forms of ambiguous evasion:

1. Evasion out of fear or hatred of making false claims.
2. Evasion out of fear or hatred of attachment.
3. Evasion out of fear or hatred of debate.
4. Evasion out of fear or hatred of admitting ignorance.

In other words, when a person would hear the dharma, they would respond, "I don't know. Maybe it is true. Maybe it is not true. I can't say it's true because I don't know and I can't deny it's true because I don't know."

The idea is that the person isn't considering the arguments presented (see Kalama Sutta), but stubbornly adhering to irrational agnosticism out of feelings of fear or hatred.

=== Non-causality beliefs ===
The Non-causality beliefs stated that the Universe and the Souls happened coincidentally. The proponents of these beliefs claimed that there was/were no reason/s behind the creation of Universe and the Identity/Self.

These beliefs were expressed because of two possibilities:

- 1 There were gods called assannasatta, which had only body and no mental will. The absence of mental will in this state was due to the nature of repressed thoughts, not the ultimate absence of thoughts. As they died in the god realm, there was a possibility that they were reborn as ascetics who achieved the ability to recall just one past life.

Here, they concluded upon their past life that, "Before this, there were no Atta and Loka. So, the Atta and Loka were created without a cause. They simply arise spontaneously. Why do I deem so? Because I didn't exist and now I do exist."

- 2. The ascetics who based their thoughts on logic and thinkings, and concluded that the Soul and the Universe happened without a cause.

All of the followers of these beliefs defended and clung on their faith and didn't believe in another faiths.

== Forty-four beliefs about the future ==
There are ascetics who based their beliefs on the future. The proponents of one of these beliefs, adhered that:

=== Perception's existence after death ===
- A. the perception still exists after death. The difference of beliefs were described that after death, the Atta:
  - 1. possessed physical shape (rupa)
  - 2. possessed no shape/immaterial (arupa)
  - 3. both had physical shape some had not (rupa and arupa)
  - 4. neither possessed physical shape nor immaterial
  - 5. Infinite
  - 6. Limited
  - 7. Both Infinite and limited
  - 8. neither Infinite nor Limited
  - 9. had a certain form of consciousness
  - 10. had several form of consciousness
  - 11.had infinite consciousness
  - 12.had limited consciousness
  - 13.always in joy/blissful state
  - 14.always in suffering state
  - 15.Both in joy and suffering
  - 16.neither joyful nor suffering
- B. the Perception vanished after death. The difference of beliefs were described that after death, the Atta was devoid of perception after dead but:
  - 1. possessed physical shape (rupa)
  - 2. possessed no physical shape (arupa)
  - 3. Both had shape and no shape
  - 4. Neither had shape nor had no shape
  - 5. Limited
  - 6. Unlimited
  - 7. Both limited and unlimited
  - 8. Neither limited nor infinite
- C. Neither there was Perception or No Perception after death. The difference of these beliefs were describe that after death, the Atta was neither devoid of perception nor non-perception, but:
  - 1. possessed physical shape (rupa)
  - 2. possessed no physical shape (arupa)
  - 3. Both had shape and no shape
  - 4. Neither had shape nor had no shape
  - 5. Limited
  - 6. Unlimited
  - 7. Both limited and unlimited
  - 8. Neither limited nor infinite

All of the followers of these beliefs defended and clung on their faith and didn't believe in another faiths.

=== Annihilation (nihilism) beliefs ===
The proponent of these beliefs declared that after death, existence simply vanished (Atta vanished). These beliefs were described in seven type of authorities and basis:

- 1. that the Atta was created from the union of father and mother's essence, composed of four elements (dhatu) and on the death, these elements ceased to exist. By this manner, Atta become non-existent.
- 2. that not only the (1) but the physical-related desire of the celestial gods, who had physical shape and take nourishment, which also cease to exist after death.
- 3. that not only the (2), but the atta of Brahma gods, which were shaped of Jhana mind, and faculties of senses which cease to exist after death.
- 4. that not only the (3), but also the atta which had transcended the concept of Infinity, where the perception of shape had been surpassed, the perception of contact between mind and object had vanished, not paying attention to major kinds of Perception, which cease to exist after death.
- 5. that not only the (4), but also the atta which had reached the Realm of Infinity of Consciousness.
- 6. that not only the (5), but also the atta which had reached Realm of Nothingness.
- 7. that not only the (6) but also the atta which had reached the realm of neither Perception nor Non-Perception.

All of the followers of these beliefs defended and clung on their faith and didn't believe in another faiths.

=== Five beliefs on attainable Nibbana ===
The proponents of these faiths proposed that Nibbana's state of bliss could be attained in the current life. They based their faith because:

- 1. The joy coming from the five senses can be enjoyed and attained thoroughly. So, the Nibbana could also be attained.
- 2. The joy from the five senses were vulnerable to change and mortal. But the joy from the attainment of the first Jhana (Dhyana) can be enjoyed and attained thoroughly. So, with the first Jhana, the Nibbana could also be attained.
- 3. ..... (same with No.2) but with Second Jhana...
- 4. ..... (same with No.3) but with Third Jhana...
- 5. ..... (same with No.4) but with Fourth Jhana. So, the Nibbana could also be attained.

All of the followers of these beliefs defended and clung on their faith and didn't believe in another faiths.

== The Buddha's conclusion ==
"The Tathagata knows these sixty-two views. He also knows the dhamma which surpasses them. Knowing that dhamma, he does not view it in the wrong way. Since he does not view it in the wrong way, he realizes by himself the extinction of defilements (i.e., greed, anger, and ignorance of the Four Ariya Truths).

Buddha finally concludes the exposition of these 'wrong' beliefs by stating that these (62) beliefs, if they are believed, will certainly cause agitations and cravings. It implies that the beliefs come to conclusion due to the inability to see the truth, as they are seized by craving (clinging), agitated by longing (feeling).

The Buddha further explains that the beliefs are originated from Contact (Phassa) as the cause. The contact is a phenomenon when the perception recognised an object beyond our Self. Then, from this brief event (like lightning in the sky, in the comparison drawn by Nagasena in Milinda Panha), rise up feelings.

Buddha states that there are no possibilities of feeling without contact. Thus, according to the law of Twelve Related Chain of Cause and Effects (Pratitya-samutpada), the people who believe in one of many of these sixty-two beliefs, will end up in round cycle of sufferings; as they have not found the truth on the cease of sufferings.

Due to their faith, they will experience feelings as a result of repeated contact through the six sense bases. In them feeling gives rise to craving; craving gives rise to clinging; clinging gives rise to current existence (upapatti bhava) and the kammic causal process (kamma bhava); the kammic causal process gives rise to rebirth; and rebirth gives rise to ageing, death, grief, lamentation, pain, distress and despair.

The Buddha states that Monks who have realized and understood the origin of contact of the six senses, and escaped the round of sufferings, would see Dhamma (Truth) of Precepts (Śīla), Concentration (Samadhi) and Wisdom (Pańńa) which surpassed all the wrong beliefs.

The Buddha then makes an analogy of a fisherman using a fine-meshed net to catch the fish in the pond. The fish represent the ascetics who cling to their beliefs. They will rise and sink in the pond, but in the end will unavoidably be caught in the net. Whereas the Buddha, who stand outside the net has found the truth and has transcended the cycle of suffering.

The Brahmajala Sutta ends with this quotation:

"When the Bhagava had delivered this discourse, the Venerable Ananda addressed him thus: "Marvellous indeed, Venerable Sir! Extraordinary indeed, Venerable Sir! What is the name of this exposition of the dhamma?" "Ananda!" said the Bhagava, "Bear in mind that this exposition of the dhamma is called Atthajala, the Net of Essence, as well as Dhammajala, the Net of the Dhamma, as well as Brahmajala, the Net of Perfect Wisdom, as well as Ditthijala, the Net of Views, as well as Anuttarasangama Vijaya, the Incomparable Victory in Battle." Thus said the Bhagavad.

== See also ==
- Aggañña Sutta
- God in Buddhism
- Twelve Nidanas
- Vipassana jhanas

== Bibliography ==
- Bhikkhu Bodhi (1978). The Discourse on the All-Embracing Net of Views: The Brahmajala Sutta and its Commentarial Exegesis, Kandy, Sri Lanka, Buddhist Publication Society
- Katz, Nathan (1981). Review: The Discourse on the All-Embracing Net of Views: The Brahmajāla Sutta and Its Commentarial Exegesis by Bhikkhu Bodhi, Jeffrey Block, Journal of the American Academy of Religion 49 (3), 512–513 JSTOR 1462409 (subscription required)
- Rhys Davids, T. W. & C. A., trans. (1899–1921). Dialogues of the Buddha, volume II, Pali Text Society, pp. 1–52
- Sirkin, Alexander (1984). On the Beginning of the Sutta Pitaka (The Brahmajala Sutta). In Shmuel Noah Eisenstadt, ed. Orthodoxy, Heterodoxy, and Dissent in India. Walter de Gruyter. pp. 57–71. ISBN 978-3-11-009659-0.
