= Dīgha Nikāya =

1st Buddhist Scriptures Collection in Pāli Canon

- SuttaCentral; OpenTipitaka
- Type: Canonical text
- Parent: Sutta Piṭaka
- Attribution: Ānanda; Bhāṇaka
- Aṭṭhakathā: Sumaṅgalavilāsinī (Dīghanikāya-aṭṭhakathā)
- Commentator: Buddhaghosa
- Ṭīkā: Līnatthappakāsinī (Sīlakkhandhavaggaṭīkā, Mahāvaggaṭīkā, Pāthikavaggaṭīkā); Sādhuvilāsinī (Sīlakkhandhavagga-abhinavaṭīkā)
- Abbreviation: DN; D

The Dīgha Nikāya ("Collection of Long Discourses") is a Buddhist scriptures collection, the first of the five Nikāyas, or collections, in the Sutta Piṭaka, which is one of the "three baskets" that compose the Pāli Tipiṭaka of Theravāda Buddhism. Some of the most commonly referenced suttas from the Dīgha Nikāya include the Mahāparinibbāṇa Sutta (DN 16), which describes the final days and passing of the Buddha, the Sigālovāda Sutta (DN 31) in which the Buddha discusses ethics and practices for lay followers, and the Samaññaphala Sutta (DN 2) and Brahmajāla Sutta (DN 1) which describe and compare the point of view of the Buddha and other ascetics in India about the universe and time (past, present, and future); and the Poṭṭhapāda (DN 9) Sutta, which describes the benefits and practice of Samatha meditation.

== Overview ==
The Dīgha Nikāya consists of 34 discourses, broken into three groups:

- Silakkhandha-vagga—The Division Concerning Morality (suttas 1-13); named after a tract on monks' morality that occurs in each of its suttas (in theory; in practice it is not written out in full in all of them); in most of them it leads on to the jhānas (the main attainments of samatha meditation), the cultivation of psychic powers and attaining the fruit of an Arhat.
- Maha-vagga—The Great Division (suttas 14-23)
- Patika-vagga—The Patika Division (suttas 24-34)

=== Parallel ===
The Dīgha Nikāya corresponds to the Dīrgha Āgama found in the Sūtra Piṭakas of various early Buddhist schools, fragments of which survive in Sanskrit. A complete version of the Dīrgha Āgama of the Dharmagupta school survives in Chinese translation under the name Cháng Āhánjīng (長阿含經). It contains 30 sūtras in contrast to the 34 suttas of the Theravadin Dīgha Nikāya. In addition, portions of the Mūlasarvāstivādin school's Dīrgha Āgama survive in Sanskrit and in Tibetan translation.

== Contents ==
Sutta No.	Pali Title	English Title
Sutta No.	Description	
DN 1	Brahmajāla Sutta	The All - embracing Net of views
DN 1	Mainly concerned with 62 types of wrong view.	
DN 2	Sāmaññaphala Sutta	The Fruits of the Contemplative Life
DN 2	King Ajātasattu of Magadha asks the Buddha about the benefits in this life of being a samana ("recluse" or "renunciant"); the Buddha's reply is in terms of becoming an Arhat.	
DN 3	Ambaṭṭha Sutta	With Ambaṭṭha
DN 3	Ambattha the Brahmin is sent by his teacher to find whether the Buddha possesses the 32 bodily marks, but on arrival he is rude to the Buddha on grounds of descent (caste); the Buddha responds that he is actually higher born than Ambattha by social convention, but that he himself considers those fulfilled in conduct and wisdom as higher.	
DN 4	Soṇadaṇḍanta Sutta	With Soṇadaṇḍa
DN 4	The Buddha asks Sonadanda the Brahmin what are the qualities that make a Brahmin; Sonadanda gives five, but the Buddha asks if any can be omitted and argues him down to two: morality and wisdom.	
DN 5	Kūṭadanta Sutta	With Kūṭadanta
DN 5	Kutadanta the Brahmin asks the Buddha how to perform a sacrifice; the Buddha replies by telling of one of his past lives, as chaplain to a king, where they performed a sacrifice which consisted of making offerings, with no animals killed.	
DN 6	Mahāli Sutta	With Mahāli
DN 6	In reply to a question as to why a certain monk sees divine sights but does not hear divine sounds, the Buddha explains that it is because of the way he has directed his meditation.	
DN 7	Jāliya Sutta	With Jāliya
DN 7	Asked by two Brahmins whether the soul and the body are the same or different, the Buddha describes the path to wisdom, and asks whether one who has fulfilled it would bother with such questions.	
DN 8	Kassapa Sīhanāda Sutta (alt:Maha Sīhanāda or Sīhanāda Sutta)	The Lion’s Roar to Kassapa
DN 8	The word sihanada literally means 'lion's roar': this discourse is concerned with asceticism.	
DN 9	Poṭṭhapāda Sutta	About Potthapada
DN 9	Asked about the cause of the arising of saññā, usually translated as perception, the Buddha says it is through training; he explains the path as above up to the jhanas and the arising of their perceptions, and then continues with the first three formless attainments; the sutta then moves on to other topics, the self and the unanswered questions.	
DN 10	Subha Sutta	With Subha
DN 10	Ananda describes the path taught by the Buddha.	
DN 11	Kevaṭṭa Sutta alt: Kevaḍḍha Sutta	To Kevatta
DN 11	Kevaddha asks the Buddha why he does not gain disciples by working miracles; the Buddha explains that people would simply dismiss this as magic and that the real miracle is the training of his followers.	
DN 12	Lohicca Sutta	To Lohicca
DN 12	On good and bad teachers.	
DN 13	Tevijja Sutta	Experts in the Three Vedas
DN 13	Asked about the path to union with Brahma, the Buddha explains it in terms of the Buddhist path, but ending with the four brahmaviharas; the abbreviated way the text is written out makes it unclear how much of the path comes before this; Richard Gombrich has argued that the Buddha was meaning union with Brahma as synonymous with nirvana.	
DN 14	Mahāpadāna Sutta	The Great Discourse on Traces Left Behind
DN 14	Tells the story of a past Buddha up to shortly after his enlightenment; the story is similar to that of Gautama Buddha.	
DN 15	Mahanidāna Sutta	The Great Causes Discourse
DN 15	On dependent origination.	
DN 16	Mahaparinibbāna Sutta	The Last Days of the Buddha
DN 16	Story of the last few months of the Buddha's life, his death and funeral, and the distribution of his relics.	
DN 17	Mahasudassana Sutta	King Mahāsudassana
DN 17	Story of one of the Buddha's past lives as a king. The description of his palace has close verbal similarities to that of the Pure Land, and Rupert Gethin has suggested this as a precursor.	
DN 18	Janavasabha Sutta	With Janavasabha
DN 18	King Bimbisara of Magadha, reborn as the god Janavasabha, tells the Buddha that his teaching has resulted in increased numbers of people being reborn as gods.	
DN 19	Maha-Govinda Sutta	The Great Steward
DN 19	Story of a past life of the Buddha.	
DN 20	Mahasamaya Sutta	The Great Meeting
DN 20	Long versified list of gods coming to honour the Buddha.	
DN 21	Sakkapañha Sutta	Sakka's Questions
DN 21	The Buddha answers questions from Sakka, ruler of the gods (a Buddhist version of Indra).	
DN 22	Mahāsatipaṭṭhāna Sutta	The Great Discourse on the Foundations of Mindfulness
DN 22	The basis for one of the Burmese vipassana meditation traditions; many people have it read or recited to them on their deathbeds.	
DN 23	Pāyāsi Sutta alt: Payasi Rājañña Sutta	With Pāyāsi
DN 23	Dialogue between the skeptical Prince Payasi and a monk.	
DN 24	Pāṭika Sutta alt:Pāthika Sutta	About Pāṭikaputta
DN 24	A monk has left the order because he says the Buddha does not work miracles; most of the sutta is taken up with accounts of miracles the Buddha has worked.	
DN 25	Udumbarika Sihanada Sutta alt: Udumbarika Sutta	The Lion’s Roar at the Monastery of Lady Udumbarikā
DN 25	Another discourse on asceticism.	
DN 26	Cakkavatti Sihanada Sutta	The Wheel-turning Emperor
DN 26	Story of humanity's decline from a golden age in the past, with a prophecy of its eventual return.	
DN 27	Aggañña Sutta	What Came First
DN 27	Another story of humanity's decline.	
DN 28	Sampasādaniya Sutta	Inspiring Confidence
DN 28	Sariputta praises the Buddha.	
DN 29	Pāsādika Sutta	The Inspiring Discourse
DN 29	The Buddha's response to the news of the death of his rival, the founder of Jainism.	
DN 30	Lakkhaṇa Sutta	The Marks of a Great Man
DN 30	Explains the actions of the Buddha in his previous lives leading to his 32 bodily marks; thus it describes practices of a bodhisattva (perhaps the earliest such description).	
DN 31	Sigalovada Sutta alt:Singala Sutta, Singalaka Sutta or Sigala Sutta	To Sigala/The Layperson's Code of Discipline
DN 31	Traditionally regarded as the lay vinaya.	
DN 32	Āṭānāṭiya Sutta	The Discourse on Atanatiya
DN 32	Gods give the Buddha a poem for his followers, male and female, monastic and lay, to recite for protection from evil spirits; it sets up a mandala or circle of protection and a version of this sutta is classified as a tantra in Tibet and Japan.	
DN 33	Saṅgāti Sutta	The Discourse for Reciting Together
DN 33	L. S. Cousins has tentatively suggested that this was the first sutta created as a literary text, at the Second Council, his theory being that sutta was originally a pattern of teaching rather than a body of literature; it is taught by Sariputta at the Buddha's request, and gives lists arranged numerically from ones to tens (cf. Anguttara Nikaya); a version of this belonging to another school was used as the basis for one of the books of their Abhidharma Pitaka.	
DN 34	Dasuttara Sutta	Up to Ten or Progressing by Tens
DN 34	Similar to the preceding sutta but with a fixed format; there are ten categories, and each number has one list in each; this material is also used in the Patisambhidamagga.	

== Translations ==
=== Complete translations ===
- Dīgha Nikāya | The Long Collection by Ṭhānissaro Bhikkhu
- Dialogues of the Buddha, tr T. W. and C. A. F. Rhys Davids, 1899–1921, 3 volumes, Pali Text Society, Vol. 1, Vol. 2, Vol. 3.
- Thus Have I Heard: the Long Discourses of the Buddha, tr Maurice Walshe, Wisdom Pubs, 1987; later reissued under the original subtitle; ISBN 0-86171-103-3
- The Long Discourses, tr Bhikkhu Sujato, 2018, published online at SuttaCentral and released into the public domain.

=== Selections ===
- The Buddha's Philosophy of Man, Rhys Davids tr, rev Trevor Ling, Everyman, out of print; 10 suttas including 2, 16, 22, 31
- Long Discourses of the Buddha, tr Mrs A. A. G. Bennett, Bombay, 1964; 1-16
- Ten Suttas from Digha Nikaya, Burma Pitaka Association, Rangoon, 1984; 1, 2, 9, 15, 16, 22, 26, 28-9, 31

== See also ==
- The other nikāyas of the Sutta Piṭaka, in their traditional order:
  - Majjhima Nikāya
  - Saṃyutta Nikāya
  - Aṅguttara Nikāya
  - Khuddaka Nikāya
- Pāli Canon
- Early Buddhist texts
- List of suttas in the Pāli Canon
