= Sassatavada =

View rejected by Buddhism

Sassatavada (Pali), also śāśvata-dṛṣṭi (Sanskrit), usually translated "eternalism", is a kind of thinking rejected by the Buddha in the nikayas (and agamas).The term is derived from the Pali word sassata, meaning eternal or permanent, and refers to the view that existence or the self continues unchanged.One example of it is the belief that the individual has an unchanging self. Views of this kind were held at the Buddha's time by a variety of groups.

The Buddha rejected this and the opposite concept of ucchedavada (annihilationism) on both logical and epistemic grounds. He proposed a Middle Way between these extremes, relying not on ontology but on causality.

Eternalism included the belief that the extinction of things means their latency and the production of things means their manifestation — this violates the Buddha's principle of the middle way.
