= Śramaṇa =

Monastic orders

Jainism and Buddhism (symbolised left and right) are two of many Indian philosophies considered as shramanic.

In Indian religions and philosophies, a śramaṇa (from Sanskrit) or samaṇa (from Pali), sometimes anglicised as shramana, (Note: Sanskrit: श्रमण, [ɕrɐmɐɳɐ]; Pali: 𑀲𑀫𑀡, samaṇa; Chinese: 沙門, shāmén; Vietnamese: sa môn; Khmer: សាម៉ាណា; Lao: ສາມານາ; Thai: สมณะ.) is a person "who labours, toils, or exerts themselves for some higher or religious purpose" or a "seeker, or ascetic, one who performs acts of austerity".

In the early Vedic texts, the term is an epithet for the great rishi sages in association with their ritualistic exertion. However, it has since come to refer to a broad class of spiritual movements originally comprising wandering ascetics from ancient India—collectively called the Śramaṇa tradition, Shramanic tradition, or occasionally Shramanism—historically parallel to but separate from movements that upheld the authority of Vedic scripture like the early Vedic religion and Brahmanism, as well as their Hindu successor movements. Rather, the Śramaṇa tradition includes those movements that rejected the Vedas, including Jainism, Buddhism, Ājīvika, Ajñana, and Cārvāka. The tradition's name, coming from the semantic narrowing of the term śramaṇa, did not hold this connotation of rejecting the Vedas until the emergence of certain post-Vedic texts considered canonical by Buddhists and Jains. In the Indian philosophical tradition, the terms āstika versus nāstika largely equate to this distinction between Vedic versus non-Vedic (Śramaṇa) belief systems.

The Śramaṇa tradition became popular in the circles of mendicants from greater Magadha who developed yogic practices, and they also developed concepts popular in all major Indian religions such as saṃsāra (the cycle of death and rebirth) and moksha (liberation from that cycle). (Note: Flood & Olivelle: "The second half of the first millennium BCE was the period that created many of the ideological and institutional elements that characterize later Indian religions. The renouncer tradition played a central role during this formative period of Indian religious history....Some of the fundamental values and beliefs that we generally associate with Indian religions in general and Hinduism in particular were in part the creation of the renouncer tradition. These include the two pillars of Indian theologies: samsara – the belief that life in this world is one of suffering and subject to repeated deaths and births (rebirth); moksa/nirvana – the goal of human existence.....") Śramaṇa schools of thought have a diverse range of beliefs, ranging from accepting or denying the existence of the soul, believing or disbelieving in free will, following particular dress guidelines or going completely nude in daily social life, and strict vegetarianism and prohibitions on violence (ahimsa) or permissibility of meat-eating and violence.

== Etymology and origin ==
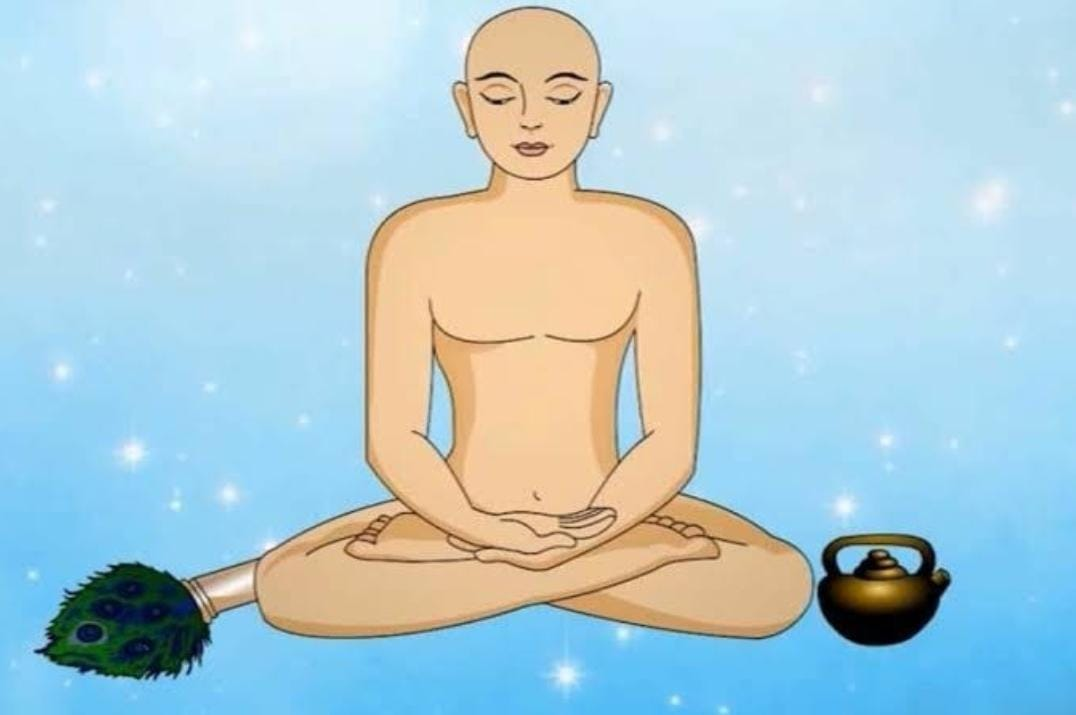
A Digambar Jain Monk

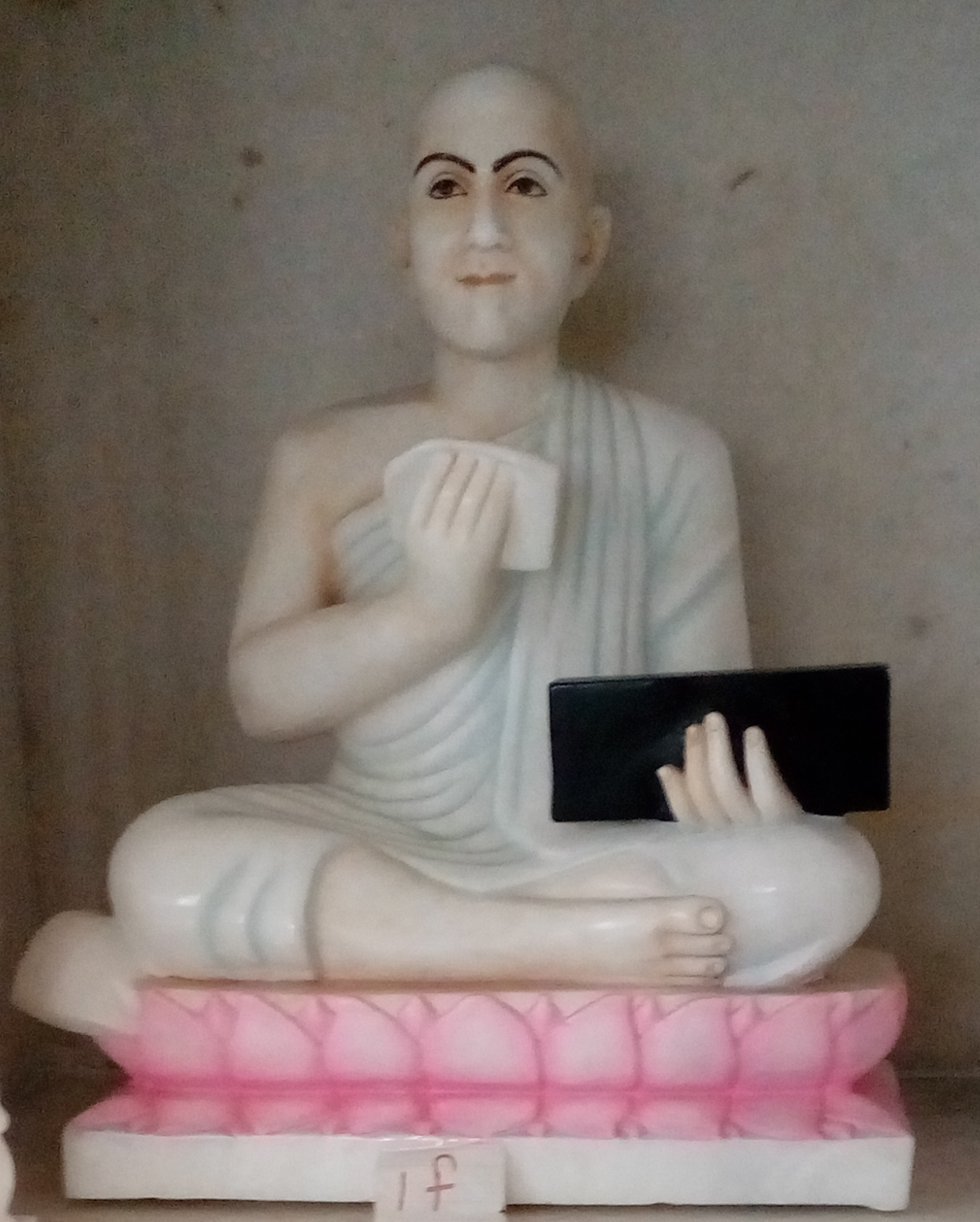
A Śvetāmbara Murtipujaka Jain ascetic

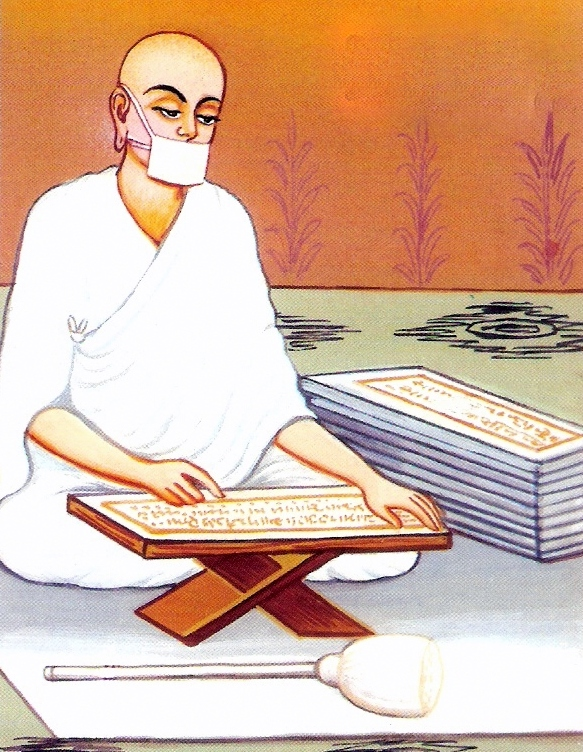
A Sthānakavāsī Jain monk

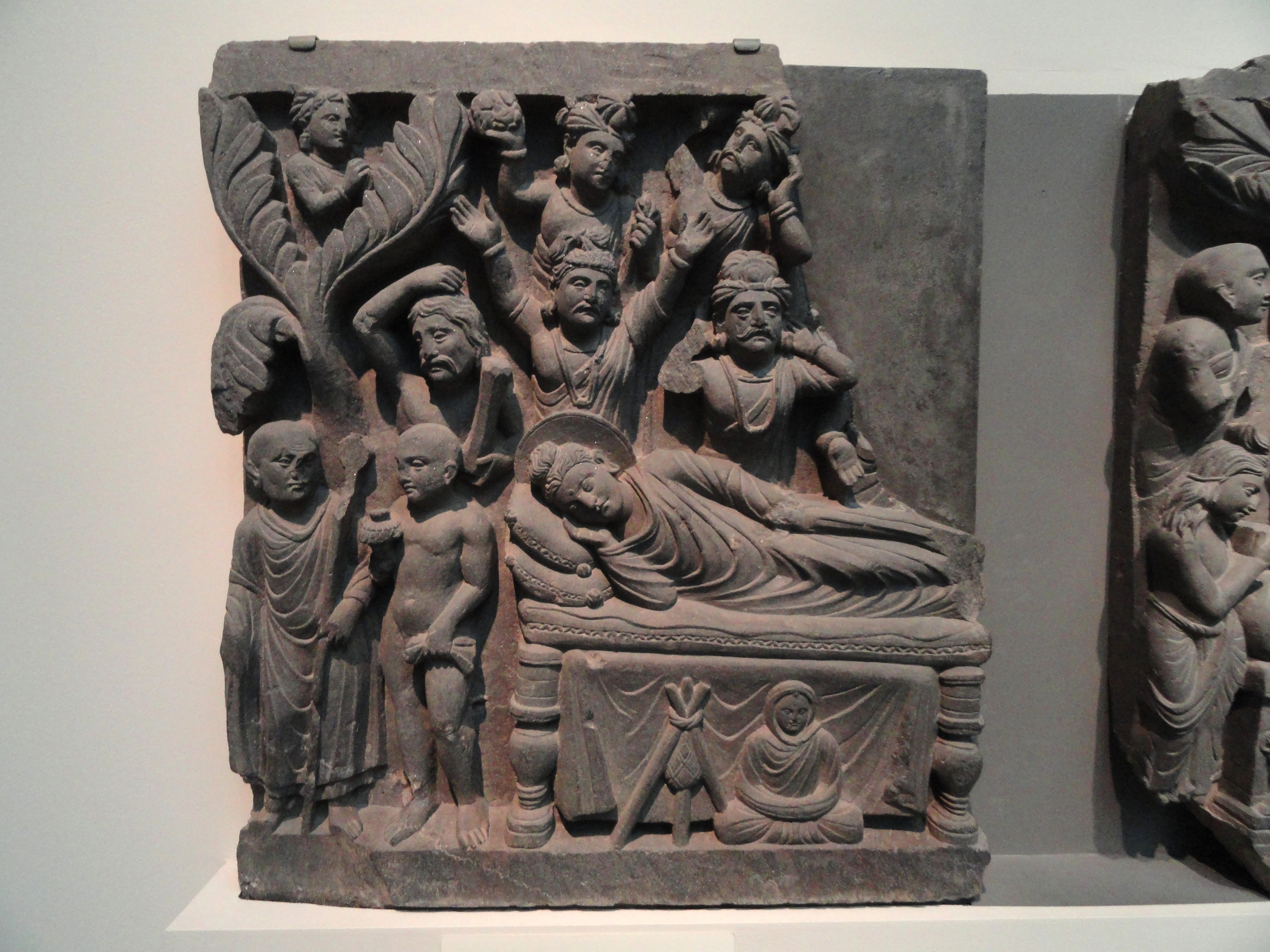
On the left: Mahākāśyapa meets an Ājīvika ascetic and learns of the Buddha's parinirvana (seen on right).

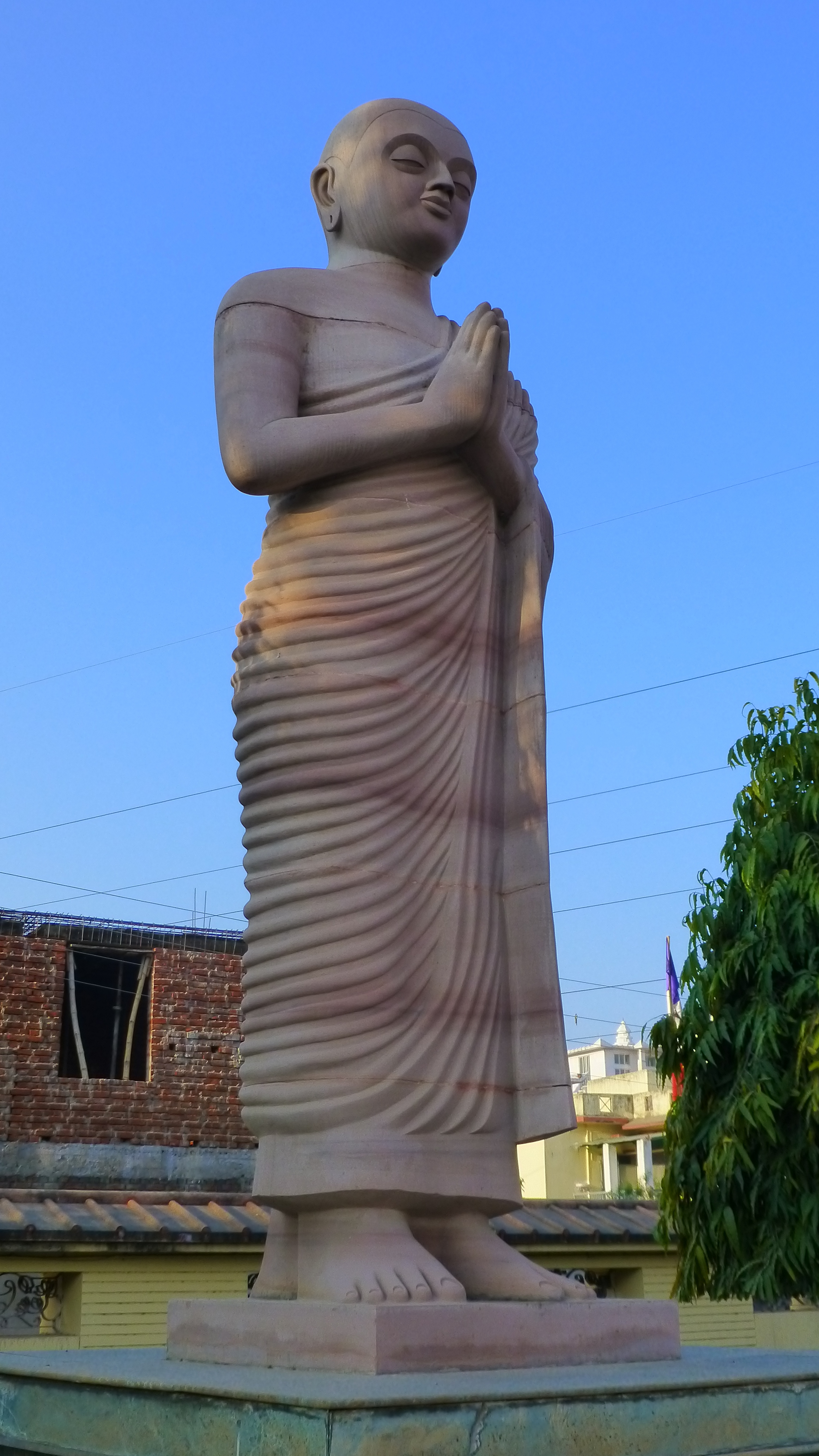
A statue of Buddha's disciple Śāriputra at Bodh Gaya

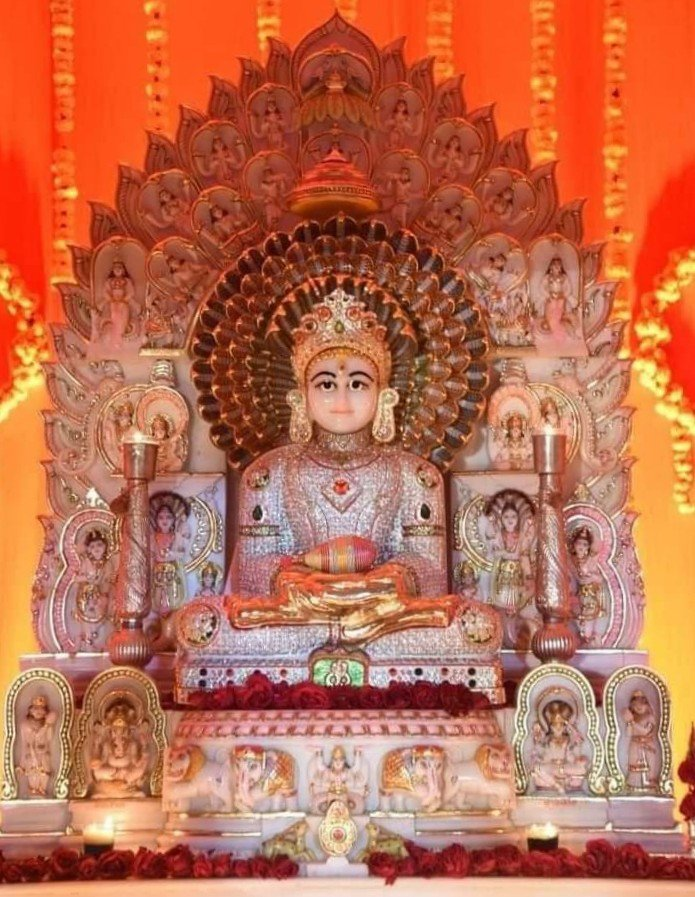
23rd Jain Tirthankar, Parshwanatha re-organized the shraman sangha in 9th century BCE

According to Olivelle and Crangle, the earliest known explicit use of the term "śramaṇa" is found in section 2.7 of the Taittiriya Aranyaka, a layer within the Yajurveda (Vedic scripture, c. 1000 BCE). It mentions śramaṇa Rishis and celibate Rishis.

According to Jaini, only two references to the word "śramaṇa" are found in the Vedic literature, one in verse 4.3.22 of the Brihadaranyaka Upanishad (7th-6th cent. BCE). It refers to a śramaṇa as belonging to a class of mendicant, but it is not clear if this was a member of a non-Vedic order as described in the much later Pali-canon.

The word "śramaṇa" is postulated to be derived from the verbal root śram, meaning "to exert effort, labor or to perform austerity". The history of wandering monks in ancient India is partly untraceable. The term 'parivrajaka' was perhaps applicable to all the peripatetic monks of India, such as those found in Buddhism, Jainism and Brahmanism.

The Śramaṇa tradition refers collectively to a variety of renunciate ascetic traditions from the middle of the 1st millennium BCE. The śramaṇa practice was "individualist, experiential, free-form, and independent of society". The term "śramaṇas" is used sometimes to contrast them with "Brahmins" in terms of their religious models. However, in the early texts, some pre-dating 3rd-century BCE ruler Ashoka, the Brahmana and śramaṇa are neither distinct nor opposed. The distinction, according to Olivelle, in later Indian literature "may have been a later semantic development possibly influenced by the appropriation of the latter term [sramana] by Buddhism and Jainism". Part of the Śramaṇa tradition retained their distinct identity from Hinduism by rejecting the epistemic authority of the Vedas, while another part of the Śramaṇa tradition synthesized with Hinduism as one stage in the Ashrama dharma, that is as renunciate sannyasins.

Buddhist commentaries associate the word's etymology with the quieting (samita) of evil (pāpa) as in the following phrase from the 3rd century BCE Dhammapada, verse 265: samitattā pāpānaŋ ʻsamaṇoʼ ti pavuccati ("someone who has pacified evil is called samaṇa"). (Note: According to Rhys Davids & Stede (1921–1925), p. 682, "Samaṇa": 'an edifying etymology of the word [is at] DhA iii.84: "samita-pāpattā [samaṇa]," cp. Dh 265 "samitattā pāpānaŋ ʻsamaṇoʼ ti pavuccati"....' The English translation of Dh 265 is based on Fronsdal (2005), p. 69.)

The first usage of the term śramaṇa in Jain literature is found in the earliest Jain texts, the Sutrakritanga, composed after the 2nd century BCE, and the Ācārāṅga Sūtra, which may have originated as an oral tradition after Mahavira's death but was principally compiled and heavily edited in its current form by Acharya Devardhigani Kshamashraman, c. 454 CE. According to Johannes Bronkhorst:

Mainly on linguistic grounds, it has been argued that the Ācārāṅga Sūtra, the Sūtrakṛtāṅga Sūtra, and the Uttarādhyayana Sūtra are among the oldest texts in the canon. This does not guarantee that they actually date from the time of Mahāvīra, nor even from the centuries immediately following his death, nor does it guarantee that all parts of these texts were composed simultaneously.

The term śramaṇa is also found in the earliest Digambara Jain text, Mulachara, composed around 150 CE. Digambaras maintain that the original Ācārāṅga Sūtra is lost, and Mulachara is the closest to the original teachings of Mahavira.

Pali samaṇa has been suggested as the ultimate origin of the word Evenki сама̄н (samān) "shaman", possibly via Middle Chinese or Tocharian B; however, the etymology of this word, which is also found in other Tungusic languages, is controversial (see Shamanism § Etymology).

== History ==
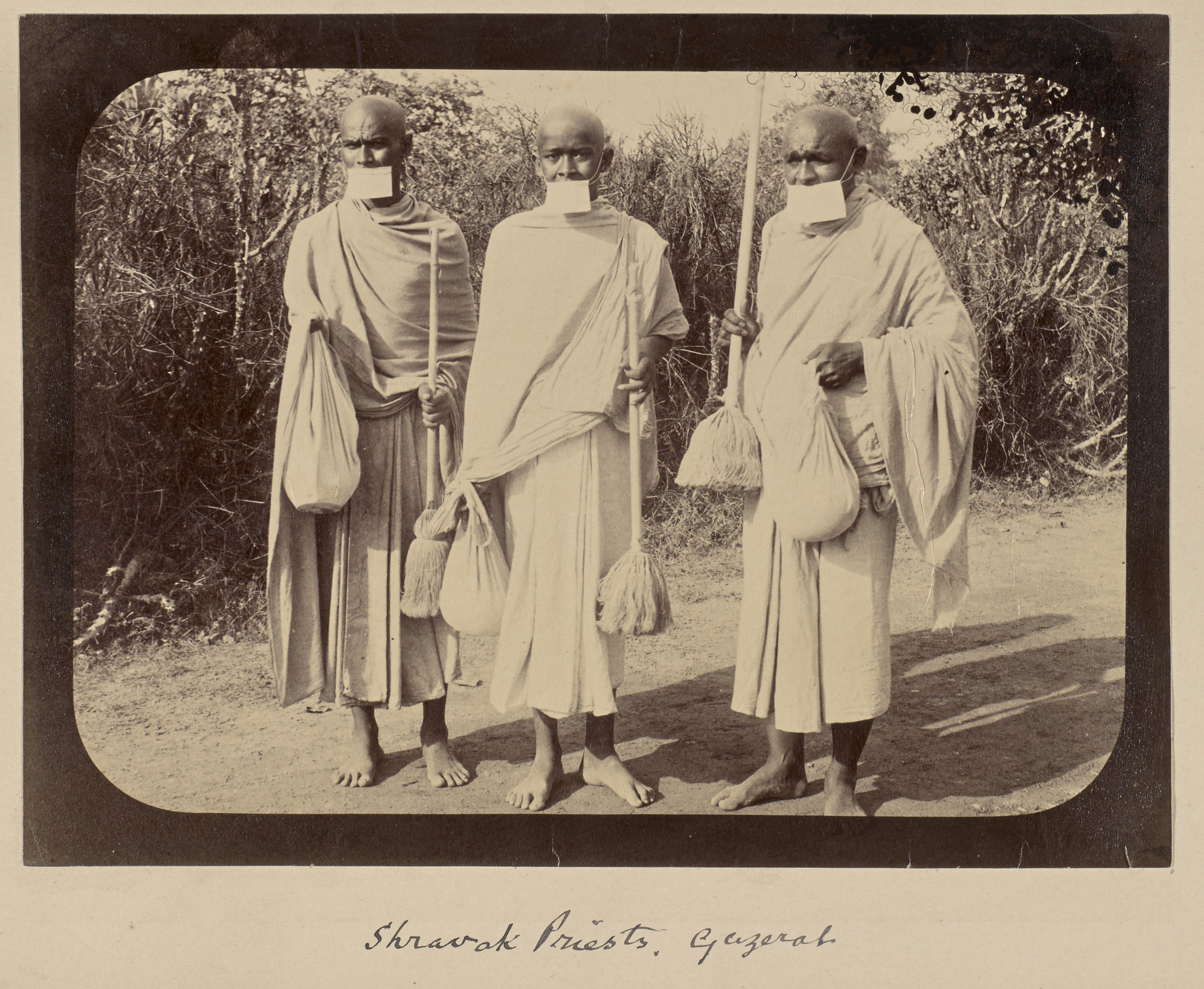
Jain Svetambara Sthanakvasi monks from Gujarat

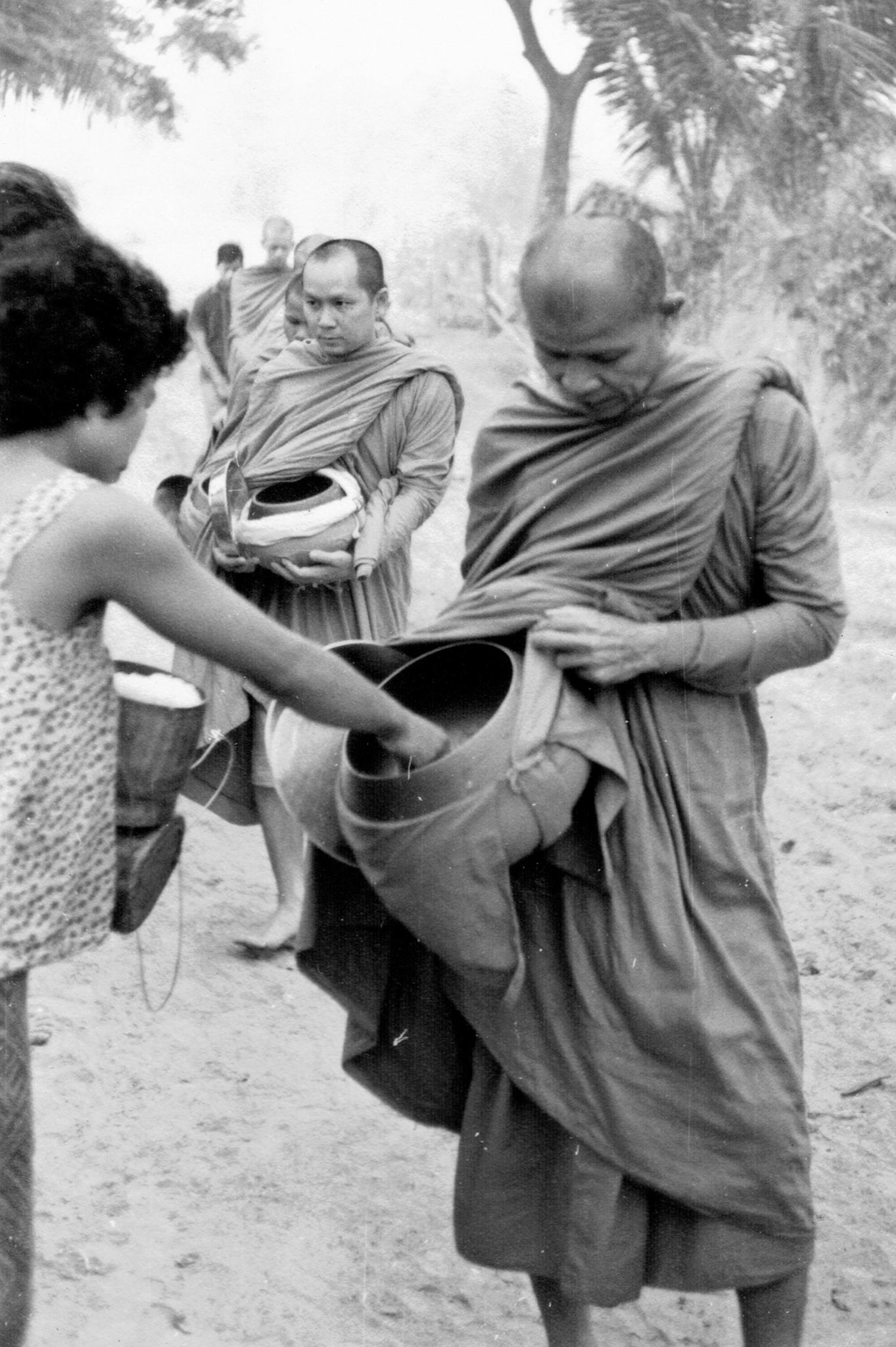
Thai Forest Tradition monks led by Ajahn Maha Bua out for the morning alms round

Several śramaṇa movements are known to have existed in India before the 6th century BCE (pre-Buddha, pre-Mahavira), and these influenced both the āstika and nāstika traditions of Indian philosophy. Martin Wiltshire states that the Śramaṇa tradition evolved in India over two phases, namely Paccekabuddha and Savaka phases, the former being the tradition of individual ascetic and latter of disciples, and that Buddhism and Jainism ultimately emerged from these as sectarian manifestations. These traditions drew upon already established Brahmanical concepts, states Wiltshire, to communicate their own distinct doctrines. Reginald Ray concurs that śramaṇa movements already existed and were established traditions in pre-6th century BCE India, but disagrees with Wiltshire that they were nonsectarian before the arrival of Buddha.

According to the Jain Agamas and the Buddhist Pāli Canon, there were other śramaṇa leaders at the time of Buddha. (Note: Some terms are common between Jainism and Buddhism, including: • Symbols: caitya, stūpa, dharmacakra • Terms: arihant (Jainism)/arhat (Buddhism), nirvāṇa, saṅgha, ācārya, Jina etc. The term pudgala is used by both but with completely different meanings.) In the Mahāparinibbāna Sutta (DN 16), a śramaṇa named Subhadda mentions:

...those ascetics, samaṇa and Brahmins who have orders and followings, who are teachers, well-known and famous as founders of schools, and popularly regarded as saints, like Pūraṇa Kassapa, Makkhali Gosāla, Ajita Kesakambalī, Pakudha Kaccāyana, Sanjaya Belatthiputta and Nigaṇṭha Nātaputta (Mahavira)...

— Digha Nikaya, 16

=== Relationship with Vedism ===
The traditional view of scholars in the field, represented for example by Govind Chandra Pande in his 1957 study on the origins of Buddhism, is that Śramaṇa began as a "distinct and separate cultural and religious" tradition from Vedic religion. However, this claim is disputed by several Indologists and Sanskrit scholars such as Patrick Olivelle.

Patrick Olivelle, a professor of Indology and known for his translations of major ancient Sanskrit works, states in his 1993 study that contrary to some representations, the original Śramaṇa tradition was part of the Vedic one. He writes,

Sramana in that context obviously means a person who is in the habit of performing srama [meaning 'labour']. Far from separating these seers from the vedic ritual tradition, therefore, śramaṇa places them right at the center of that tradition. Those who see them [Sramana seers] as non-Brahmanical, anti-Brahmanical, or even non-Aryan precursors of later sectarian ascetics are drawing conclusions that far outstrip the available evidence.

According to Olivelle, and other scholars such as Edward Crangle, the concept of Śramaṇa exists in the early Brahmanical literature. The term is used in an adjectival sense for sages who lived a special way of life that the Vedic culture considered extraordinary. However, Vedic literature does not provide details of that life. The term did not imply any opposition to either Brahmins or householders. In all likelihood, states Olivelle, during the Vedic era, neither did the śramaṇa concept refer to an identifiable class nor to ascetic groups as it does in later Indian literature.

Vedic literature contains references to proto-renunciant ascetics such as the Kēśins and Vrātyas. Gavin Flood notes that the Kēśins, described in the Rig Veda as long-haired "silent ones" or munis, resemble later Hindu ascetics. Karel Werner describes the Rig Veda's Kēśin hymn as depicting a wandering muni "who possesses extraordinary powers and has deep spiritual experiences".

He with the long loose locks (of hair) supports Agni, and moisture, heaven, and earth; He is all sky to look upon: he with long hair is called this light.
The Munis, girdled with the wind, wear garments of soil hue; They, following the wind's swift course, go where the Gods have gone before.

— Rig Veda, Hymn 10.136.1-2 (Note: केश्यग्निं केशी विषं केशी बिभर्ति रोदसी । केशी विश्वं स्वर्दृशे केशीदं ज्योतिरुच्यते ॥१॥ मुनयो वातरशनाः पिशङ्गा वसते मला । वातस्यानु ध्राजिं यन्ति यद्देवासो अविक्षत ॥२॥)

The hymn uses the term vātaraśana (वातरशन) which means "girdled with wind". Some scholars have interpreted this to mean "sky-clad, naked monk" and therefore a synonym for Digambara (a Jainism sect). However, other scholars state that this could not be the correct interpretation because it is inconsistent with the words that immediately follow, "wearing soil-hued garments". The context likely means that the poet is describing the "munis" as moving like the wind, their garments pressed by the wind. According to Olivelle, it is unlikely that the vātaraśana implies a class within the Vedic context.

The Vedic society, states Olivelle, contained many people whose roots were non-Aryan who must have influenced the Aryan classes. However, it is difficult to identify and isolate these influences, in part because the Vedic culture not only developed from influences but also from its inner dynamism and socio-economic developments.

According to Indian anthropologist Ramaprasad Chanda, the origins of Sramanism trace back to pre-Vedic and pre-Aryan cultures, particularly those practicing magic. He posited that the practice of asceticism could be linked to the initiatory phases of seclusion and abstinence observed by shamans.

According to Bronkhorst, the śramaṇa culture arose in "Greater Magadha," which was Indo-Aryan, but not Vedic. In this culture, Kshatriyas were placed higher than Brahmins, and it rejected Vedic authority and rituals.

=== Pre-Buddhist śrāmana schools in Buddhist texts ===
Views of the six heretical teachers
- The views of six śramaṇa in the Pāli Canon, known as the six heretical teachers, based on the Sāmaññaphala Sutta.

Pūraṇa Kassapa
- Amoralism (akiriyavāda; natthikavāda): There is no reward or punishment for either good or bad deeds.

Makkhali Gośāla (Ājīvika)
- Fatalism (ahetukavāda; niyativāda): We are powerless; suffering is pre-destined.

Ajita Kesakambalī (Charvaka)
- Materialism (ucchedavāda; natthikavāda): Live happily; with death, all is annihilated.

Pakudha Kaccāyana
- Eternalism and categoricalism (sassatavāda; sattakāyavāda): Matter, pleasure, pain and the soul are eternal and do not interact.

Nigaṇṭha Ñāṭaputta (Jainism)
- Restraint (mahāvrata): Be endowed with, cleansed by, and suffused with [merely] the avoidance of all evil.

Sañjaya Belaṭṭhiputta (Ajñana)
- Agnosticism (amarāvikkhepavāda): "I don't think so. I don't think in that way or otherwise. I don't think not or not not." Suspension of judgement.

Pande attributes the origin of Buddhism, not entirely to the Buddha, but to a "great religious ferment" towards the end of the Vedic period when the Brahmanic and Shramanic traditions intermingled.

The Buddhist text of the Samaññaphala Sutta identifies six pre-Buddhist śrāmana schools, identifying them by their leader. These six schools are represented in the text to have diverse philosophies, which according to Padmanabh Jaini, may be "a biased picture and does not give a true picture" of the shramanic schools rivaling with Buddhism,

- The Purana Kassapa (Amoralism) śrāmana school: believed in antinomian ethics. This ancient school asserted that there are no moral laws, nothing is moral or immoral, there is neither virtue nor sin.
- The Makkhali Gosala (Ajivika) śrāmana school: believed in fatalism and determinism that everything is the consequence of nature and its laws. This school denied that there is free will, but believed that soul exists. Everything has its own individual nature, based on how one is constituted from elements. Karma and consequences are not due to free will, cannot be altered, everything is pre-determined, because of and including one's composition.
- The Ajita Kesakambali (Lokayata-Charvaka) śrāmana movement: believed in materialism. Denied that there is an after-life, any samsara, any karma, or any fruit of good or evil deeds. Everything including humans are composed of elemental matter, and when one dies one returns to those elements.
- The Pakudha Kaccayana śrāmana movement: believed in atomism. Denied that there is a creator, knower. Believed that everything is made of seven basic building blocks which are eternal, neither created nor caused to be created. These seven blocks included earth, water, fire, air, happiness, pain and soul. All actions, including death is mere re-arrangement and interpenetration of one set of substances into another set of substances.
- The Mahavira or (Jain) śrāmana school: believed in fourfold restraint, avoidance of all evil (see more below).
- The Sanjaya Belatthiputta (Ajñana) śrāmana movement: believed in absolute agnosticism. Refused to have any opinion either way about existence of or non-existence of after-life, karma, good, evil, free will, creator, soul, or other topics.

These pre-Buddhist śrāmana movements were organized Sanghagani (orders of monks and ascetics), according to the Buddhist Samaññaphala Sutta. The six leaders above are described as a Sanghi (head of the order), Ganacariyo (teacher), Cirapabbajito (recluse), Yasassi and Neto (of repute and well known).

=== Jainism ===
Jain literature too mentions Pūraṇa Kassapa, Makkhali Gosāla and Sañjaya Belaṭṭhaputta. (Note: The Pali Canon is the only source for Ajita Kesakambalī and Pakudha Kaccāyana.) During the life of Buddha, Mahavira and the Buddha were leaders of their śramaṇa orders. Nigaṇṭha Nātaputta refers to Mahāvīra. (Note: In the Buddhist Pāli literature, these non-Buddhist ascetic leaders – including Mahavira – are also referred to as Titthiyas of Tīrthakas.)

According to Pande, Jainas were the same as the Niganthas mentioned in the Buddhist texts, and they were a well established sect when Buddha began preaching. He states that "Jainas" appear to have belonged to the non-Vedic Munis and Sramanas who may have been ultimately connected with pre-Vedic civilization". The śramaṇa system is believed by a majority of Jaina scholars to have been of independent origin and not a protest movement of any kind, were led by Jaina thinkers, and were pre-Buddhist and pre-Vedic.

Some scholars posit that the Indus Valley civilisation symbols may be related to later Jain statues, and the bull icon may have a connection to Rishabhanatha. According to Dundas, outside of the Jain tradition, historians date the Mahavira as about contemporaneous with the Buddha in the 5th-century BCE, and accordingly the historical Parshvanatha, based on the c. 250-year gap, is placed in 8th or 7th century BCE.

=== Buddhism ===
It was as a śramaṇa that the Buddha left his father's palace and practised austerities. Gautama Buddha, after fasting nearly to death by starvation, regarded extreme austerities and self-mortification as useless or unnecessary in attaining enlightenment, recommending instead a "Middle Way" between the extremes of hedonism and self-mortification. Devadatta, a cousin of Gautama, caused a split in the Buddhist sangha by demanding more rigorous practices.

The Buddhist movement chose a moderate ascetic lifestyle. This was in contrast to Jains, who continued the tradition of stronger austerity, such as fasting and giving away all property including clothes and thus going naked, emphasizing that complete dedication to spirituality includes turning away from material possessions and any cause for evil karma. The moderate ascetic precepts, states Collins, likely appealed to more people and widened the base of people wanting to become Buddhists. Buddhism also developed a code for interaction of world-pursuing lay people and world-denying Buddhist monastic communities, which encouraged continued relationship between the two. Collins states, for example, that two rules of the vinaya (monastic code) were that a person could not join a monastic community without parent's permission, and that at least one son remained with each family to care for that family. Buddhism also combined the continuing interaction, such as giving alms to renunciants, in terms of merit gained for good rebirth and good karma by the lay people. This code played a historic role in its growth, and provided a means for reliable alms (food, clothing) and social support for Buddhism.

Randall Collins states that Buddhism was more a reform movement within the educated religious classes, composed mostly of Brahmins, rather than a rival movement from outside these classes. In early Buddhism, the largest number of monastics were originally brahmins, and virtually all were recruited from the two upper classes of society – brahmins and kshatriyas. (Note: Randall Collins: "Thus, although the Buddha himself was a kshatriya the largest number of monks in the early movement were of Brahman origin. In principle, the Sangha was open to any caste; and since it was outside the ordinary world, caste had no place in it. Nevertheless, virtually all monks were recruited from the upper two classes. The biggest source of lay support, however, the ordinary donor of alms, were the landowning farmers.")

=== Ājīvika ===
Ājīvika was founded in the 5th century BCE by Makkhali Gosala, as a śramaṇa movement and a major rival of early Buddhism and Jainism. Ājīvikas were organised renunciates who formed discrete communities.

The Ājīvikas reached the height of their prominence in the late 1st millennium BCE, then declined, yet continued to exist in south India until the 14th century CE, as evidenced by inscriptions found in southern India. Ancient texts of Buddhism and Jainism mention a city in the first millennium BCE named Savatthi (Sanskrit Śravasti) as the hub of the Ājīvikas; it was located in what is now the North Indian state of Uttar Pradesh. In later part of the common era, inscriptions suggests that the Ājīvikas had a significant presence in the South Indian state of Karnataka and the Kolar district of Tamil Nadu.

Original scriptures of the Ājīvika school of philosophy once existed, but these are unavailable and probably lost. Their theories are extracted from mentions of Ājīvikas in the secondary sources of ancient Indian literature. Scholars question whether Ājīvika philosophy has been fairly and completely summarized in these secondary sources, written by ancient Buddhist and Jaina scholars, who represented competing and adversarial philosophies to Ājīvikas.

=== Conflict between śramaṇa movements ===
According to the 2nd century CE text Ashokavadana, the Mauryan emperor Bindusara was a patron of the Ajivikas, and it reached its peak of popularity during this time. Ashokavadana also mentions that Bindusara's son Ashoka converted to Buddhism, became enraged at a picture that depicted Buddha in negative light, and issued an order to kill all the Ajivikas in Pundravardhana. Around 18,000 followers of the Ajivika sect were executed as a result of this order.

Jaina texts mention separation and conflict between Mahavira and Gosala, accusation of contemptuous comments, and an occasion where the Jaina and Ajivika monastic orders "came to blows". However, given the texts alleging conflict and portraying Ajivikas and Gosala in negative light were written centuries after the incident by their śramaṇa opponents, and given the versions in Buddhist and Jaina texts are different, the reliability of these stories, states Basham, is questionable.

== Philosophy ==
=== Jain philosophy ===
Jainism derives its philosophy from the teachings and lives of the twenty-four Tirthankaras, of whom Mahavira was the last. Acharyas Umaswati, Kundakunda, Haribhadra, Yaśovijaya Gaṇi and others further developed and reorganized Jain philosophy in its present form. The distinguishing features of Jain philosophy are its belief in the independent existence of soul and matter, predominance of karma, the denial of a creative and omnipotent God, belief in an eternal and uncreated universe, a strong emphasis on nonviolence, an accent on anekantavada and morality and ethics based on liberation of the soul. The Jain philosophy of anekantavada and syādvāda, which posits that the truth or reality is perceived differently from different points of view, and that no single point of view is the complete truth, have made very important contributions to ancient Indian philosophy, especially in the areas of skepticism and relativity.

=== Usage in Jain texts ===
Jain monastics are known as śramaṇas while lay practitioners are called śrāvakas. The religion or code of conduct of the monks is known as the śramaṇa dharma. Jain canons like Ācārāṅga Sūtra and other later texts contain many references to śramaṇas.

==== Ācāranga Sūtra ====
One verse of the Ācāranga Sūtra defines a good śramaṇa:

Disregarding (all calamities) he lives together with clever monks, insensitive to pain and pleasure, not hurting the movable and immovable (beings), not killing, bearing all: so is described the great sage, a good Sramana.

The chapter on renunciation contains a śramaṇa vow of non-possession:

I shall become a śramaṇa who owns no house, no property, no sons, no cattle, who eats what others give him; I shall commit no sinful action; Master, I renounce to accept anything that has not been given.' Having taken such vows, (a mendicant) should not, on entering a village or free town, take himself, or induce others to take, or allow others to take, what has not been given.

The Ācāranga Sūtra gives three names of Mahavira, the twenty-fourth Tirthankara, one of which was Śramaṇa:

The Venerable ascetic Mahavira belonged to the Kasyapa gotra. His three names have thus been recorded by tradition: by his parents he was called Vardhamana, because he is devoid of love and hate; (he is called) Sramana (i.e. ascetic), because he sustains dreadful dangers and fears, the noble nakedness, and the miseries of the world; the name Venerable Ascetic Mahavira has been given to him by the gods.

==== Sūtrakrtanga ====
Another Jain canon, Sūtrakrtanga describes the śramaṇa as an ascetic who has taken Mahavrata, the five great vows:

He is a Śramaṇa for this reason that he is not hampered by any obstacles, that he is free from desires, (abstaining from) property, killing, telling lies, and sexual intercourse; (and from) wrath, pride, deceit, greed, love, and hate: thus giving up every passion that involves him in sin, (such as) killing of beings. (Such a man) deserves the name of a Śramaṇa, who subdues (moreover) his senses, is well qualified (for his task), and abandons his body.

The Sūtrakrtanga records that prince, Ardraka, who became disciple to Mahavira, arguing with other heretical teachers, told Makkhali Gosala the qualities of śramaṇas:

He who (teaches) the great vows (of monks) and the five small vows (of the laity 3), the five Âsravas and the stoppage of the Âsravas, and control, who avoids Karman in this blessed life of Śramaṇas, him I call a Śramaṇa.

=== Buddhist philosophy ===
Buddha initially practiced severe austerities, fasting himself nearly to death of starvation. However, he later considered extreme austerities and self-mortification as unnecessary and recommended a "Middle Way" between the extremes of hedonism and self-mortification.

The Brahmajāla Sutta mentions many śramaṇas with whom Buddha disagreed. For example, in contrast to shramanic Jains whose philosophical premise includes the existence of an Atman (self, soul) in every being, Buddhist philosophy denies that there is any self or soul. This concept called Anatta (or Anatman) is a part of Three Marks of existence in Buddhist philosophy, the other two being Dukkha (suffering) and Anicca (impermanence). According to Buddha, states Laumakis, everything lacks inherent existence. Buddhism is a transtheistic philosophy, which is especially concerned with pratītyasamutpāda (dependent origination) and śūnyatā (emptiness or nothingness).

From rock edicts, it is found that both Brahmans as well as śramaṇas enjoyed equal sanctity.

=== Ajivika philosophy ===
The Ājīvika school is known for its Niyati doctrine of absolute determinism, the premise that there is no free will, that everything that has happened, is happening and will happen is entirely preordained and a function of cosmic principles. Ājīvika considered the karma doctrine as a fallacy. Ajivika metaphysics included a theory of atoms similar to the Vaisheshika school, where everything was composed of atoms, qualities emerged from aggregates of atoms, but the aggregation and nature of these atoms was predetermined by cosmic forces. Ājīvikas were atheists and rejected the epistemic authority of the Vedas, but they believed that in every living being there is an ātman – a central premise of Hinduism and Jainism as well.

=== Comparison of philosophies ===
The śramaṇa traditions subscribed to diverse Indian philosophies, significantly disagreeing with each other as well as with the six schools of orthodox Hindu philosophy. The differences ranged from a belief that every individual has a soul (self, atman) to asserting that there is no soul, from axiological merit in a frugal ascetic life to that of a hedonistic life, from a belief in rebirth to asserting that there is no rebirth.

A denial of the scriptural authority of the Vedas and rejection of Upanishadic doctrine of the absolute Brahman was one of the several differences between shramanic philosophies and orthodox Hinduism. Jaini states that while authority of vedas, belief in a creator, path of ritualism and social system of heredity ranks, made up the cornerstones of Brahminical schools, the path of asceticism was the chief characteristic of all the shramanic schools. (Note: According to Rahul Sankrityayan, the 7th-century CE Buddhist scholar Dharmakirti wrote: vedapramanyam kasyacit kartrvadah/ snane dharmeccha jativadavalepah// santaparambhah papahanaya ceti/ dhvastaprajnanam pancalirigani jadye The unquestioned authority of the vedas; the belief in a world-creator; the quest for purification through ritual bathings; the arrogant division into castes; the practice of mortification to atone for sin; - these five are the marks of the crass stupidity of witless men. Translated by Rahul Sankrityayan Belief in the authority of the Vedas, and in a creator, desiring merit from bathing, pride in caste, and practising self denial for the eradication of sins – these five are the marks of stupidity of one whose intelligence is damaged. Translated by Ramkrishna Bhattacharya)

In some cases when the shramanic movements shared the same philosophical concepts, the details varied. In Jainism, for example, Karma is based on a materialist element philosophy, where Karma is the fruit of action conceived as material particles which stick to the soul and keep it away from natural omniscience. The Buddha conceived Karma as a chain of causality leading to attachment to the forms of the material world and hence to rebirth. The Ajivikas were fatalists and elevated Karma as inescapable fate, where a person's life goes through a chain of consequences and rebirths until it reaches its end. Other śramaṇa movements such as those led by Pakkudha Kaccayana and Purana Kashyapa, denied the existence of Karma.

Comparison of ancient Indian philosophies
	Ajivika	Buddhism	Charvaka	Jainism	Orthodox schools of Indian philosophy (Brahmanic)
Karma	Denies	Affirms	Denies	Affirms	Affirms
Samsara, Rebirth	Affirms	Affirms	Denies	Affirms	Some school affirm, some not
Ascetic life	Affirms	Affirms	Denies	Affirms	Affirms only as Sannyasa
Rituals, Bhakti	Affirms	Affirms, optional (Pali: Bhatti)	Denies	Affirms, optional	Theistic school: Affirms, optional Others: Deny
Ahimsa and Vegetarianism	Affirms	Affirms; Unclear on meat as food		Strongest proponent of non-violence; vegetarianism to avoid violence against animals	Affirms as highest virtue, but Just War affirmed too; vegetarianism encouraged, but choice left to the Hindu
Free will	Denies	Affirms	Affirms	Affirms	Affirms
Maya	Affirms	Affirms (prapañca)	Denies	Affirms	Affirms
Atman (Soul, Self)	Affirms	Denies	Denies	Affirms	Affirms
Creator God	Denies	Denies	Denies	Denies	Theistic schools: Affirm; Others: Deny
Epistemology (Pramana)	Pratyakṣa, Anumāṇa, Śabda	Pratyakṣa, Anumāṇa	Pratyakṣa	Pratyakṣa, Anumāṇa, Śabda	Various, Vaisheshika (two) to Vedanta (six): Pratyakṣa (perception), Anumāṇa (inference), Upamāṇa (comparison and analogy), Arthāpatti (postulation, derivation), Anupalabdi (non-perception, negative/cognitive proof), Śabda (Reliable testimony)
Epistemic authority	Denies: Vedas	Affirms: Buddha text Denies: Vedas	Denies: Vedas	Affirms: Jain Agamas; Denies: Vedas	Affirm: Vedas and Upanishads, (Note: Elisa Freschi (2012): The Vedas are not deontic authorities and may be disobeyed, but still recognized as an epistemic authority by a Hindu; (Note: This differentiation between epistemic and deontic authority is true for all Indian religions)); Denies: other texts
Salvation (Soteriology)	Samsdrasuddhi	Nirvana (realize Śūnyatā)		Siddha	Moksha, Nirvana, Kaivalya; Advaita, Yoga, others: Jivanmukti; Dvaita, theistic: Videhamukti
Metaphysics (Ultimate Reality)		Śūnyatā		Anekāntavāda	Brahman

== Influences on Indian culture ==
The śramaṇa traditions influenced and were influenced by Hinduism and by each other. According to some scholars, the concept of the cycle of birth and death, the concept of samsara and the concept of liberation may quite possibly be from śramaṇa or other ascetic traditions. Obeyesekere suggests that tribal sages in the Ganges valley may instead have inspired the ideas of samsara and liberation, just like rebirth ideas that emerged in Africa and Greece. O'Flaherty states that there isn't enough objective evidence to support any of these theories.

It is in the Upanishadic period that shramanic theories influence the Brahmanical theories. While the concepts of Brahman and Atman (Soul, Self) can be consistently traced back to pre-Upanishadic layers of Vedic literature, the heterogeneous nature of the Upanishads show infusions of both social and philosophical ideas, pointing to evolution of new doctrines, likely from the shramanic movements.

Śramaṇa traditions brought concepts of Karma and Samsara as central themes of debate. Concepts, such as karma and reincarnation may have originated in the śramaṇa or the renunciant traditions, and then become mainstream. There are multiple theories of possible origins of concepts such as Ahimsa, or non-violence. The Chāndogya Upaniṣad, dated to about the 7th century BCE, in verse 8.15.1, has the earliest evidence for the use of the word Ahimsa in the sense familiar in Hinduism (a code of conduct). It bars violence against "all creatures" (sarvabhuta) and the practitioner of Ahimsa is said to escape from the cycle of metempsychosis (CU 8.15.1). According to some scholars, such as D. R. Bhandarkar, the Ahimsa dharma of the śramaṇas made an impression on the followers of Brahamanism and their law books and practices.

Theories on who influenced whom, in ancient India, remains a matter of scholarly debate, and it is likely that the different philosophies contributed to each other's development. Doniger summarizes the historic interaction between scholars of Vedic Hinduism and shramanic Buddhism:

There was such constant interaction between Vedism and Buddhism in the early period that it is fruitless to attempt to sort out the earlier source of many doctrines, they lived in one another's pockets, like Picasso and Braque (who, in later years, were unable to say which of them had painted certain paintings from their earlier, shared period).

— Wendy Doniger,

=== Hinduism ===
Randall Collins states that "the basic cultural framework for lay society which eventually became Hinduism" was laid down by Buddhism. (Note: Randall Collins: "Buddhism laid down the basic cultural framework for lay society which eventually became Hinduism. Buddhism cannot be understood as a reaction against the caste system, any more than it is simply an effort to escape from karma.")

Modern Hinduism can be regarded as a combination of Vedic and śramaṇa traditions as it is substantially influenced by both traditions. Among the Astika schools of Hinduism, Vedanta, Samkhya, and Yoga philosophies influenced and were influenced by the śramaṇa philosophy. As Geoffrey Samuel notes,

Our best evidence to date suggests that [yogic practice] developed in the same ascetic circles as the early śramaṇa movements (Buddhists, Jainas and Ajivikas), probably in around the sixth and fifth centuries BCE.

Some Brahmins joined the śramaṇa movement such as Cānakya and Sāriputta. Similarly, according to Jain tradition, a group of eleven Brahmins accepted Jainism and become Mahavira's chief disciples or ganadharas. (Note: "Mahavira, it is said, proceeded to a place in the neighbourhood where a big yagna was being organized by a brahman, Somilacharya, and preached his first sermon denouncing the sacrifice and converting eleven learned Brahmins assembled there who became his chief disciples called ganadharas.")

Patrick Olivelle suggests that the Hindu ashrama system of life, created probably around the 4th-century BCE, was an attempt to institutionalize renunciation within the Brahmanical social structure. This system gave complete freedom to adults to choose what they want to do, whether they want to be householders or sannyasins (ascetics), the monastic tradition was a voluntary institution. This voluntary principle, states Olivelle, was the same principle found in Buddhist and Jain monastic orders at that time.

== In Western literature ==
Various possible references to "śramaṇas", with the name more or less distorted, have appeared in ancient Western literature.

=== Clement of Alexandria (150–211) ===
Clement of Alexandria makes several mentions of the śramaṇas, both in the context of the Bactrians and the Indians:

Thus philosophy, a thing of the highest utility, flourished in antiquity among the barbarians, shedding its light over the nations. And afterwards it came to Greece. First in its ranks were the prophets of the Egyptians; and the Chaldeans among the Assyrians; and the Druids among the Gauls; and the Samanaeans among the Bactrians ("Σαμαναίοι Βάκτρων"); and the philosophers of the Celts; and the Magi of the Persians, who foretold the Saviour's birth, and came into the land of Judaea guided by a star. The Indian gymnosophists are also in the number, and the other barbarian philosophers. And of these there are two classes, some of them called Sarmanae ("Σαρμάναι"), and Brahmanae ("Βραχμαναι").

=== Porphyry (233–305) ===
Porphyry extensively describes the habits of the śramaṇas, whom he calls "Samanaeans", in his On Abstinence from Animal Food Book IV. He says his information was obtained from "the Babylonian Bardesanes, who lived in the times of our fathers, and was familiar with those Indians who, together with Damadamis, were sent to Caesar."

For the polity of the Indians being distributed into many parts, there is one tribe among them of men divinely wise, whom the Greeks are accustomed to call Gymnosophists. But of these there are two sects, over one of which the Brahmins preside, but over the other the Samanaeans. The race of the Brahmins, however, receive divine wisdom of this kind by succession, in the same manner as the priesthood. But the Samanaeans are elected, and consist of those who wish to possess divine knowledge.

On entering the order

All the Bramins originate from one stock; for all of them are derived from one father and one mother. But the Samanaeans are not the offspring of one family, being, as we have said, collected from every nation of Indians. A Bramin, however, is not a subject of any government, nor does he contribute any thing together with others to government.

The Samanaeans are, as we have said, elected. When, however, any one is desirous of being enrolled in their order, he proceeds to the rulers of the city; but abandons the city or village that he inhabited, and the wealth and all the other property that he possessed. Having likewise the superfluities of his body cut off, he receives a garment, and departs to the Samanaeans, but does not return either to his wife or children, if he happens to have any, nor does he pay any attention to them, or think that they at all pertain to him. And, with respect to his children indeed, the king provides what is necessary for them, and the relatives provide for the wife. And such is the life of the Samanaeans. But they live out of the city, and spend the whole day in conversation pertaining to divinity. They have also houses and temples, built by the king, in which they are stewards, who receive a certain emolument from the king, for the purpose of supplying those that dwell in them with nutriment. But their food consists of rice, bread, autumnal fruits, and pot-herbs. And when they enter into their house, the sound of a bell being the signal of their entrance, those that are not Samanaeans depart from it, and the Samanaeans begin immediately to pray.

On food and living habits

And with respect to those that are philosophers, among these some dwell on mountains, and others about the river Ganges. And those that live on mountains feed on autumnal fruits, and on cows' milk coagulated with herbs. But those that reside near the Ganges, live also on autumnal fruits, which are produced in abundance about that river. The land likewise nearly always bears new fruit, together with much rice, which grows spontaneously, and which they use when there is a deficiency of autumnal fruits. But to taste of any other nutriment, or, in short, to touch animal food, is considered by them as equivalent to extreme impurity and impiety. And this is one of their dogmas. They also worship divinity with piety and purity. They spend the day, and the greater part of the night, in hymns and prayers to the Gods; each of them having a cottage to himself, and living, as much as possible, alone. For the Bramins cannot endure to remain with others, nor to speak much; but when this happens to take place, they afterwards withdraw themselves, and do not speak for many days. They likewise frequently fast.

On life and death

They are so disposed with respect to death, that they unwillingly endure the whole time of the present life, as a certain servitude to nature, and therefore they hasten to liberate their souls from the bodies [with which they are connected]. Hence, frequently, when they are seen to be well, and are neither oppressed, nor driven to desperation by any evil, they depart from life.

German novelist Hermann Hesse, long interested in Eastern, especially Indian, spirituality, wrote Siddhartha, in which the main character becomes a Samana upon leaving his home.

== See also ==
- Āstika and nāstika
- Bhikkhu
- Bhikkhuni
- Fakir
- Hermit
- Mahajanapadas
- Sadhu
- Śrāmaṇera
- Yogi
- Yogini

== Sources ==
- Basham, A. L. (1951). History and Doctrines of the Ajivikas.
- Basham, A. L. (2009). History and Doctrines of the Ajivikas – a Vanished Indian Religion. Motilal Banarsidass. ISBN 978-8120812048.
- Bodhi, Bhikkhu, ed. (2001). The Middle-Length Discourses of the Buddha: A Translation of the Majjhima Nikāya. Translated by Bhikkhu Ñāṇamoli. Boston: Wisdom Publications. ISBN 0-86171-072-X.
- Bronkhorst, Johannes (2007). Greater Magadha: Studies in the Culture of Early India. Brill.
- Dundas, Paul (2002) [1992]. The Jains (2nd ed.). Routledge. ISBN 978-0-415-26605-5.
- Fronsdal, Gil (2005). The Dhammapada: A New Translation of the Buddhist Classic with Annotations. Boston: Shambhala Publications. ISBN 1-59030-380-6.
- Gethin, Rupert (1998). The Foundations of Buddhism. Oxford: Oxford University Press. ISBN 0-19-289223-1.
- Jaini, Padmanabh S. (2000). Collected papers on Jaina Studies. Motilal Banarsidass. ISBN 978-8120816916.
- Jaini, Padmanabh S. (2001). Collected papers on Buddhist Studies. Motilal Banarsidass. ISBN 978-8120817760.
- Long, Jeffrey D. (2013). Jainism: An Introduction. I.B. Tauris.
- Olivelle, Patrick (1993). The Aśrama System: The History and Hermeneutics of a Religious Institution. Oxford University Press. ISBN 978-0-19-534478-3 – via Archive.org.
- Pande, Govind (1995) [1957]. Studies in the Origins of Buddhism (Reprint ed.). Motilal Banarsidass. ISBN 978-81-208-1016-7.
- Rhys Davids, T.W.; Stede, William, eds. (1921–1925). The Pali Text Society's Pali–English Dictionary. Chipstead: Pali Text Society. A general on-line search engine for the PED is available at dsal.uchicago.edu Archived 25 July 2021 at the Wayback Machine.
- Samuel, Geoffrey (2008). The Origins of Yoga and Tantra. Cambridge University Press. ISBN 978-0-521-69534-3.
- Tähtinen, Uno (1976). Ahimsa: Non-Violence in Indian Tradition. London. ISBN 0-09-123340-2.
- Thanissaro Bhikkhu (trans.) (1997). Samaññaphala Sutta: The Fruits of the Contemplative Life (DN 2). Available on-line at accesstoinsight.org Archived 9 February 2014 at the Wayback Machine.
- Walshe (1995). The Long Discourses of the Buddha: A Translation of the Dīgha Nikāya. Translated by Maurice O'Connell. Somerville: Wisdom Publications. ISBN 0-86171-103-3.
- Zimmer, Heinrich (1953) [April 1952]. Campbell, Joseph (ed.). Philosophies Of India. London: Routledge & Kegan Paul. ISBN 978-81-208-0739-6. " This article incorporates text from this source, which is in the public domain."
