= Sakya Pandita =

Tibetan Lama (1182–1251)

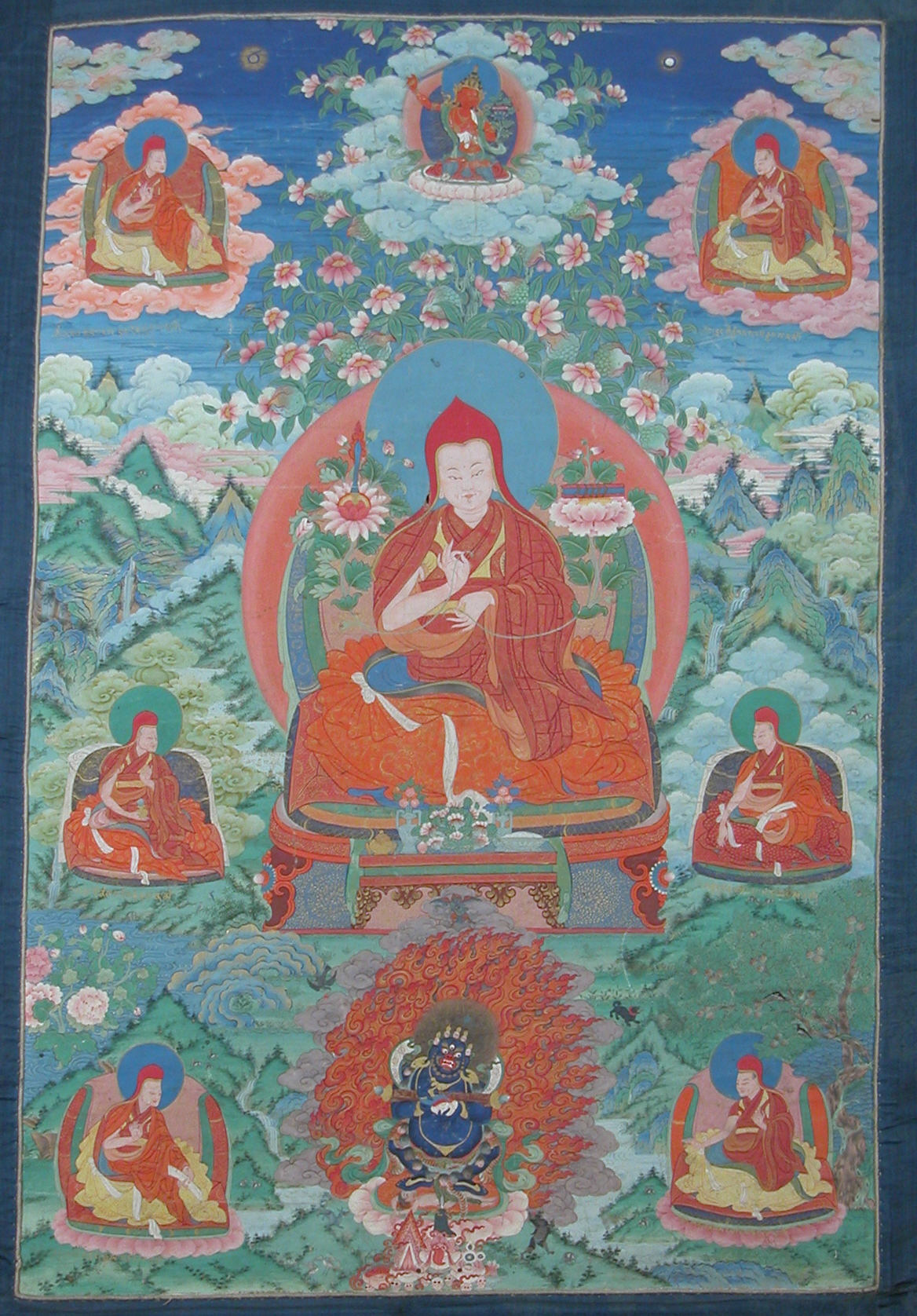
Thangka painting of Sakya Pandita, Eastern Tibet, 18th century

Sakya Pandita Kunga Gyeltsen (Tibetan: ས་སྐྱ་པཎ་ཌི་ཏ་ཀུན་དགའ་རྒྱལ་མཚན, Wylie: Sa skya Paṇḍita Kun dga’ rgyal mtshan) who lived from (1 April 1182 – 28 December 1251) was a Tibetan spiritual leader and Buddhist scholar and the fourth of the Five Sakya Forefathers (Wylie: sa skya gong ma lnga). Künga Gyeltsen is generally known simply as Sakya Pandita (or Sapan for short), a title given to him in recognition of his scholarly achievements and knowledge of Sanskrit. He is held in the tradition to have been an emanation of Manjusri, the embodiment of the wisdom of all the Buddhas.

Sakya Pandita was also known as a great scholar in Tibet, India, Mongolia and China and was proficient in the five great sciences of Buddhist philosophy, medicine, grammar, dialectics and sacred Sanskrit literature as well as the minor sciences of rhetoric, synonymies, poetry, music, dancing and astrology. He is considered to be the fourth Sakya Forefather and sixth Sakya Trizin and one of the most important figures in the Sakya lineage.

== Biography ==
=== Early life ===
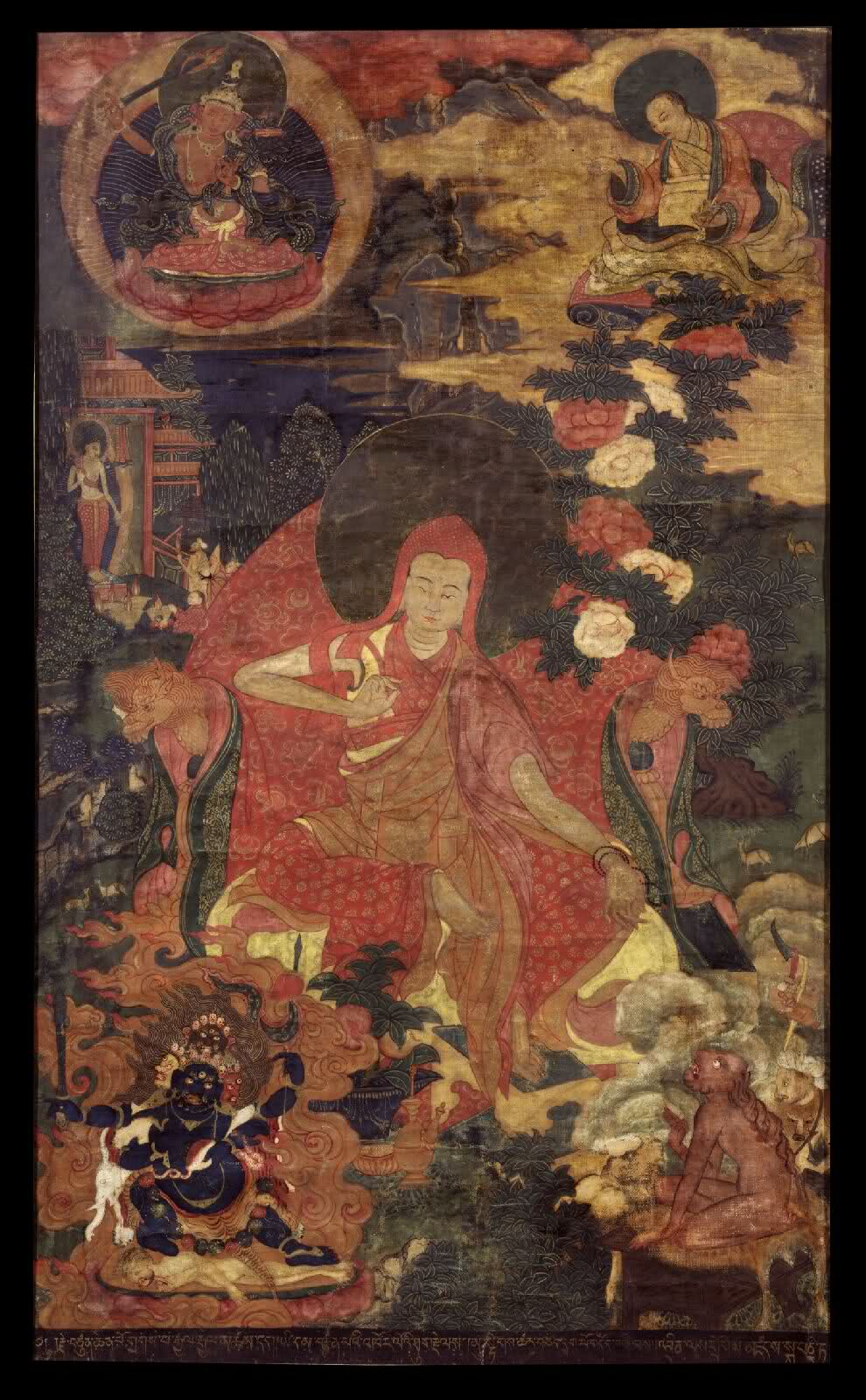
Sakya Pandita

Sakya Pandita was born as Palden Dondup at Sakya in the noble family of Jamyanggön (Khön). This lineage had held the abbotship of Sakya on a hereditary basis since 1073. His father was Palchen Öpoche (1150–1203) and his mother Machig Nyitri Cham. Sakya Pandita was the nephew of Jetsun Dragpa Gyaltsen (1147–1216), and became the principal disciple of this prominent scholar. He was instructed in the sutras and tantras by Dragpa Gyaltsen and mastered Sanskrit and three Inner Asian languages. Eventually he was initiated as a śrāmaṇera by his master and given the religious name Künga Gyeltsen.

As a young monk, he visited the prominent Kashmiri scholar Śākyaśribhadra, who ordained him as a bhikśu in 1208, and taught him sutras and mantras. Legend has it that he visited Kyirong on his way back, and there defeated a brahman Shastri in a debate on logic. He then overcome his opponent in a contest of supernatural powers. As he wanted to show his fellow Tibetans the peculiar dress of Indian Brahmin priests, he brought the Shastri to Tibet where he was killed by the protective deities of the land. The Shastri's head was then tied to a pillar of the great temple in Sakya which remained until modern times. The experience of Sakya Pandita with Indian learning provided a notably Indian influence to his scholarship later on. His ordination as bhikśu marked the inception of Sakya as a proper monastic order. He acceded as dansa chenpo or abbot-ruler of Sakya upon the death of his uncle Dragpa Gyaltsen in 1216.

=== Mongol invasion ===
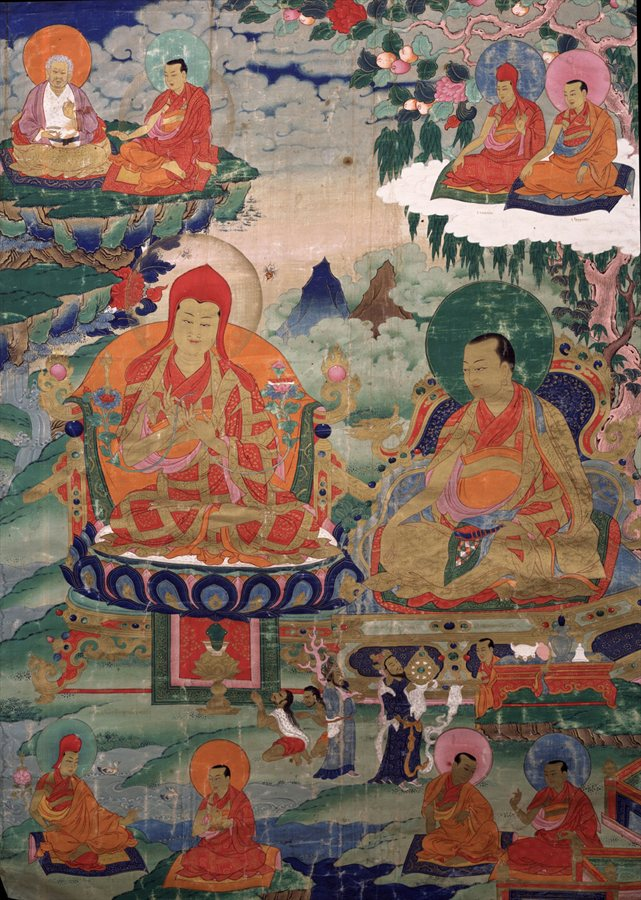
Sakya Pandita and Drogön Chögyal Phagpa, one of the five founders of the Sakya school of Tibetan Buddhism, first vice-king of Tibet. In 1253 Kublai Khan invited Sakya Pandita's Nephew Chogyal Phagpa to court. As a result, Buddhism was declared the state religion and Phagpa was given authority over three of Tibet's provinces.

According to later Tibetan historiography, Genghis Khan subjugated a king of Tibet in 1206 and then sent a letter to the Sakya abbot. After the death of Genghis Khan in 1227, the Tibetans stopped sending tribute. This is, however, a legend without historical foundation. It is known, however, that the grandson of Genghis Khan and second son of Ögedei Khan, Godan Khan was granted an appanage at Liangzhou (present-day Wuwei, Gansu) in 1239. In 1240 he sent an invasion force under Dorta into Tibet. The Mongols reached the Phanyul Valley north of Lhasa, killing some 500 monks and destroying and looting monasteries, villages and towns. The Gyal Lhakhang Monastery went up in flames and many monks of the Reting Monastery were slaughtered by the horsemen. The Drigung Monastery was saved, ostensibly since the Mongols believed that a sudden avalanche of stones could be attributed to the supernatural powers of the lamas. According to L. Petech, the Reting Monastery itself escaped destruction when Dorta reached Dam, and its abbot suggested the Mongols to contact Sakya Paṇḍita, who was a famous author and religious figure and could represent the Tibetans vis-à-vis the Mongols. According to J.Y. Chang, it was rather the Drigung abbot who made the proposal. Later chronicles assert that Dorta sent message to Prince Godan and enumerated the four foremost sects and lamas of Tibet: Kadam, Taklung, Drigung, and Sakya. Godan drew the conclusion that Sakya Pandita was an important and wise lama who could show the road to salvation, and ordered to send a letter of "invitation" and presents to him. The actual reason for selecting the Sakya might have been that the sect was specialized in magic rituals that resonated with Mongol beliefs, and was prominent in spreading Buddhist morality. It was also important that Sakya Paṇḍita was a religious hierarch by birth, and thus represented a dynastic continuity useful for the Mongol aim to rule via respected intermediaries.

=== The stay at the Mongol court ===
Research published in 1977 shows that the surviving letter of summons attributed to Godan is in fact a later fabrication. Nevertheless, Sakya Pandita was indeed summoned to Godan's royal camp at Liangzhou in 1244. The cleric left Sakya in the company of his two young nephews, the ten-year-old Phagpa and six-year-old Chakna Dorje. As he continually preached sermons along his way he did not arrive at Prince Godan's camp until 1246. There he had to wait for Godan who at the time participated in the Kurultai where Güyük Khan was enthroned. Sakya Paṇḍita and Godan first met in early 1247. He gave religious instruction to the prince and greatly impressed the court with his personality and powerful teachings. He is also said to have cured Prince Godan of a serious illness, probably leprosy. In return, he was allegedly given "temporal authority over the 13 myriarchies [Trikor Chuksum] of Central Tibet." Since the myriarchies were not yet constituted by this time the story is not entirely correct. It should be understood in the sense that Sakya Paṇḍita was used as the main agent of the Mongols in Tibetan affairs. Tibetan historians quote a long letter by his hand to the various clerical and temporal lords in Tibet in 1249. In order to spare Tibet from devastating invasions, he wrote, it was necessary that the local regimes unconditionally accepted Mongol overlordship. A census was to be taken, and the lords must henceforth carry out the administration in consultation with envoys dispatched by Sakya and in accordance with Mongol law. However, the sources keep silent about the actual imposition of Mongol rule in these years. The death of Güyük Khan in 1248 led to internal rivalries in the dynasty of Genghis Khan until the enthronement of Möngke Khan in 1251. This left Tibetan affairs in a state of limbo for the time being.

=== Death and inheritance ===
Sakya Pandita died on 28 November 1251, at the age of seventy, in the Trulpaide temple in Liangzhou. He chose his brother's son Chogyal Phagpa as his heir, and nominated him before his death as the successor to his religious authority by giving him his conch shell and begging bowl. After his death Phagpa continued his mission. The conch is one of the Ashtamangala and the begging bowl was a particular symbol of Gautama Buddha and the śramaṇas.

After Sakya Pandita's death, the new Mongol ruler Möngke Khan chose to patronize the Drikung Kagyu while the other main schools were put under the protection of various Mongol princes. Nevertheless, a decree from 1252 stated that the Sakya precepts should be followed in the main. Meanwhile, Phagpa won a position in the court of Möngke's brother Kublai Khan and became the tantric guru of the prince in 1258. When Kublai came to power in 1260 he appointed Phagpa guoshi "preceptor of the kingdom". Thus began a strong Sakya-Mongol alliance, and the seat or densa (Wylie: gdan sa) of Sakya became the administrative capital of Tibet in 1264. This lasted until about the middle of the 14th century. During the reign of the 14th Sakya Trizin, Lama Dampa Sonam Gyaltsen, the myriarch Tai Situ Changchub Gyaltsen of the Phagmodrupa dynasty began to subordinate the Central Tibetan province Ü, marking the "beginning of the end of the period of Sakya power in Central Tibet."

In the lineage of the Tibetan Panchen Lamas there were considered to be four Indian and three Tibetan tulkus of Amitābha before Khedrup Gelek Pelzang, 1st Panchen Lama. The lineage starts with Subhuti, one of the original disciples of Gautama Buddha. Sakya Paṇḍita is considered to be the second Tibetan emanation of Amitābha in this line.

== Work ==
He is best known for his works such as the Treasury of Logic on Valid Cognition (Tshad ma rigs pa'i gter) and the Discrimination of the Three Vows (sDom-gsum rab-dbye). He produced five major works in all, the other three being The Entrance Gate for the Wise (Mkhas pa rnams 'jug pa'i sgo), Clarifying the Sage's Intention (Thub pa'i dgongs gsal), and the Elegant Sayings of Sakya Pandita (sa skya legs bshad). The latter is a collection of moral precepts in verse which was imitated by others and translated into Mongolian.

Sakya Pandita focused on doctrine and logic "basing himself upon the Pramanavarttika of Dharmakirti" and was very interested in rhetoric. With his profound knowledge of Indian Buddhism, Sakya Paṇḍita was observant of what he saw as aberrations in Tibetan Buddhism. He was suspicious of lamas who promised enlightenment without going through the consecutive stages of Buddhist practices, and he took a more conservative view. The scholastic tradition of Tibetan Buddhism owes much to him, and his works are still included in the monastic curricula today.

According to José Cabezón, Sakya Pandita wrote numerous critiques of Tibetan Buddhist doctrines of his time. He was very concerned with refuting what he considered to be false views and practices in Tibet. In his Treasure of Reasoning (Rigs gter), he roundly critiques Chapa Chökyi Sengé's (1109–1169) interpretation of Dharmakirti's thought.

Sakya Pandita is also known as a critic of a certain kind of Mahamudra theory and practice called White Panacea (dkar po chig thub) or “self-sufficient white remedy.” According to Cabezon, this "is the doctrine that “the realization of the nature of mind is sufficient in and of itself to bring about spontaneously and instantaneously the simultaneous consummation of all virtuous qualities, including Buddhahood itself.”"

Sapan focused his critique on the figure of Gampopa (1079–1153), and his disciple, Zhang Tshal pa (1123–93). His critique was influential on numerous later figures, including the Fifth Dalai Lama (1617–82), Jamyang Shepe Dorje Ngawang Tsondrü (1648–1722) and the Second Belmang, Konchok Gyeltsen (1764–1853).

His Treatise on Music provides valuable historical information about liturgical music theory and performance practice.

=== List of works ===
==== Selected works ====
- Treasury of Logic on Valid Cognition (Tshad ma rigs pa'i gter)
  The Padmakara Translation Group (2005: p. 37) holds that the Tsod-ma rigs-gter, a celebrated work many consider Sakya Paṇḍita's magnum opus, champions Dhamakirti's 'antirealism' by countering Chapa's (phya pa chos kyi seng ge, 1109–1169) interpretation of Dharmakirti.
- Discrimination of the Three Vows (sDom-gsum rab-dbye)
  Published in English as A Clear Differentiation of the Three Codes: Essential Distinctions among the Individual Liberation, Great Vehicle, and Tantric Systems by Sakya Pandita Kunga Gyaltshen, translated by Jared Douglas Rhoton. (State University of New York Press: 2001).
- The Entrance Gate for the Wise (Mkhas pa rnams 'jug pa'i sgo)
  Section III published in English as The Entrance Gate for the Wise (Section III): Saskya Pandita on Indian and Tibetan Traditions of Pramana and Philosophical Debate. by David P. Jackson (Arbeitskreis fur Tibetisch und Buddhistiche Studien Universiteit Wein: 1987); Section I published in English as "The Dharma's Gatekeepers: Sakya Pandita on Buddhist Scholarship in Tibet", by Jonathan C. Gold (SUNY: 2007)
- Clarifying the Sage's Intention (Thub pa'i dgongs gsal)
  A commentary on the on two verses of Maitreya-nātha’s Mahayana-sutra-alamkara-karika, this serves as the main Lam Rim text in the Sakya school.
- The Elegant Sayings of Sakya Pandita (sa skya legs bshad)
  Published in English as Ordinary Wisdom: Sakya Pandita's Treasury of Good Advice, translated by John T. Davenport. (Wisdom Publications:2000 ISBN 0-86171-161-0).
- Treatise on Music (Rol-mo'i btsan-bcos)
  Translated into English by Ricardo Canzio, it presents Sakya Pandita's views on the principles of Tibetan music and chant, metrical composition, and performance instructions.

==== Other works ====
- sgra'i bstan bcos
- tshad ma'i bstan bcos sde bdun gyi snying po rig pa'i gter 'grel pa dang bcas pa
- bzo'i bstan bcos
- sku gzugs kyi bstan bcos
- sa brtag pa
- bstan pa rin po che'i rtsis
- yan lag brgyad pa'i bsdus don
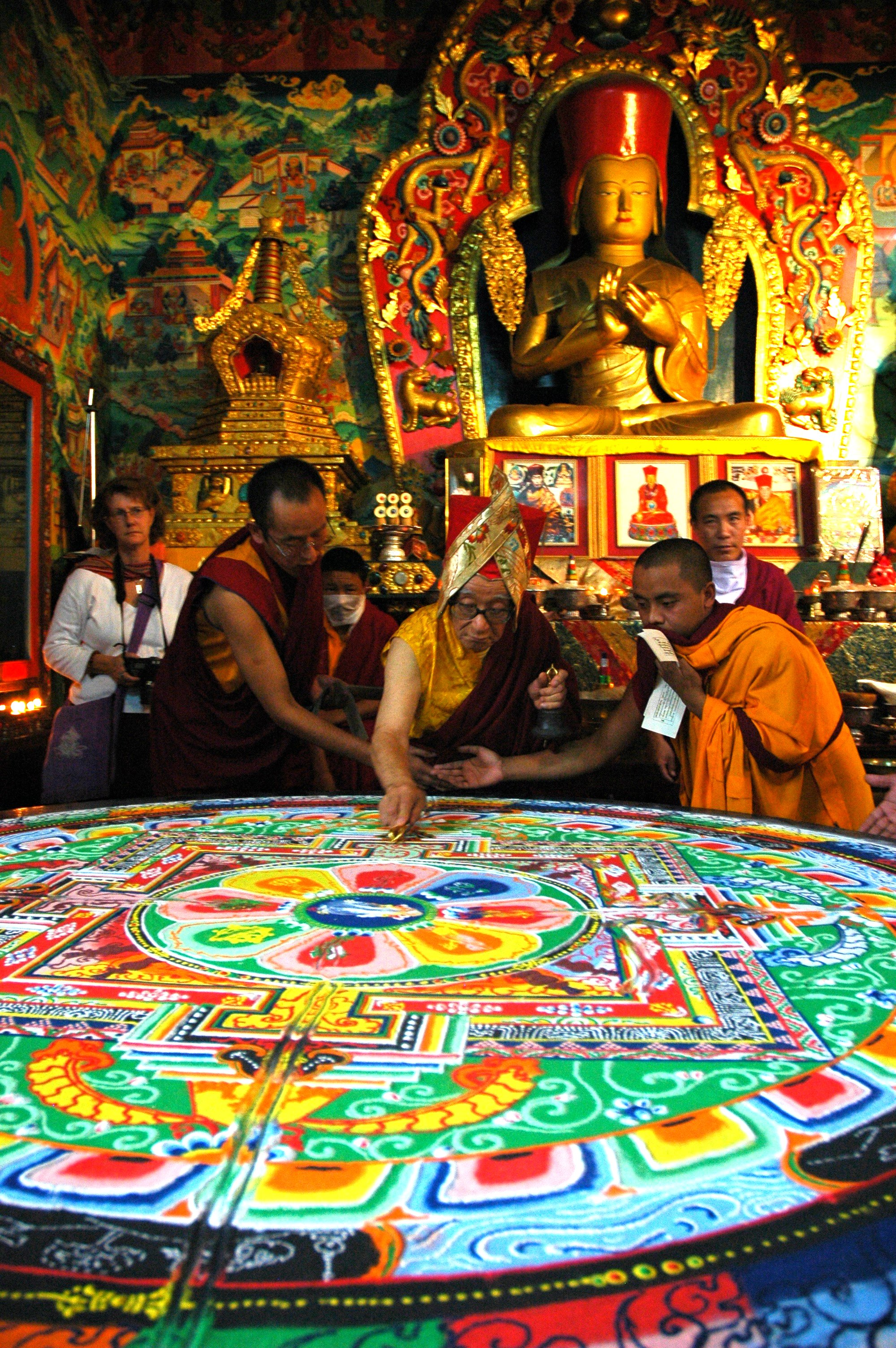
- Dagchen Rinpoche closes the Hevajra Mandala of colored sand using a gold dorje below statue of Sakya Pandita
  phyogs bcu'i sangs rgyas byang chub sems dpa' la zhu ba'i 'phrin yig dang skyes bu dam pa rnams la springs yig sogs 'phrin yig dang zhus lan mang ba
- grub mtha' rnam 'byed
- pha rol phyin pa'i gzhung lugs spyi'i tshogs chos chen mo
- bdag med ma'i bstod pa'i 'grel pa
- rdo rje theg pa'i man ngag rten 'brel lnga'i yi ge
- lam sbas bshad dang bla ma'i rnal 'byor
- sems bskyed chen mo lung sbyor
- chos nyams su blang ba'i rim pa
- theg pa chen po'i lam gyi rnam gzhag mdor bsdus
- bsngo ba'i yon bshad
- bdag nyid kyi rnam thar nga brgyad ma'i rtsa 'grel
- sdeb sbyor me tog gi chun po
- snyan ngag mkhas pa'i kha rgyan
- mngon brjod tshig gi gter
- zlos gar rab dga'i 'jug pa
- byis pa bde blag tu 'jug pa'i 'grel pa
- bstod pa rgyud gsum 'khor lo'i 'grel pa
- sangs rgyas la bstod pa sogs bstod pa mang po mdzad

==== Translations ====
- Pramānavārttika of Dharmakīrti (with Śākyaśrībhadra)
- Pramānavārttikatīkā of Śamkaranandana (with Samghaśrī)
- Samksiptapranidhāna of Candragomin
- Amarakośa of Amarasimha (partial)
- Kāvyādarśa of Dandin (partial)
- Āryaguhyamanitilaka (tantra)
- Āryavajrapātālatantrarāja
- Sarvatathāgatakāyavākcitta Guhyālamkāravyūhatantrarāja
- Ganacakravidhi
- Yuganaddhaprakāśasekaprakriyā
- Vajrakīlamūlatantra

== See also ==
- Brian Cutillo's Illuminations of Sakya Pandita
- Drogön Chögyal Phagpa
- Mongol conquest of Tibet
- Patron and priest relationship
- Simhamukha
- Tibet under Yuan rule

== Notes ==
Preceded by none	Sakya lama of Tibet (Mongol protégé); 1247–1251	Succeeded by Phagpa
