= Kunga Rinpoche =

Buddhist Lama of the Sakya school

Shabdrung Lama Kunga Thartse Rinpoche is a Tibetan teacher of the Sakya school of Vajrayana Tibetan Buddhism. Lama Kunga Rinpoche is licensed in California to perform marriages with a Tibetan Buddhist ceremony.

== Early life ==
Losang Kunga Gyurme was born into a noble family in Lhasa, Tibet in 1935, the son of Tsipon Shuguba, the last Finance Minister in the Dalai Lama's government in Lhasa. His mother Tsering Chonzom, was daughter of Trimon Norbu Wangyal, who became the chief cabinet minister in the Tibetan government of the 13th Dalai Lama. Trimon was the second son of Shakabpa Tenzin Norgye. Hence, Lama Kunga Rinpoche, is a close relative of the Tibetan historian Tsepon Shakabpa. Lama Kunga is also closely related to His Holiness Sakya Trinzin Dolma Phodrang, and the late King Jigme Dorje Palbar Bista, of Mustang, Nepal.

At the age of 7, he was recognized as a reincarnation of Sevan Repa, a heart disciple of Milarepa, Tibet's 11th-century poet-saint. Rinpoche entered Ngor Monastery at eight, and was ordained as a monk at sixteen. In 1959, he was Vice-Abbot of Ngor Monastery, in the Sakya Tradition, but fled Western Tibet following the Dalai Lama's escape during the 1959 Tibetan uprising. His two brothers are Tsenshab Rinpoche Yeshi Thondup of Sera Mey, and Thartse Khen Rinpoche, who is also known as Hiroshi Sonami of Thartse Ngor Monastery.

== Establishment of Ewam Choden Tibetan Buddhist Center ==
In 1962, Lama Kunga Rinpoche came to the United States, and in 1973 established Ewam Choden Tibetan Buddhist Center in Kensington, California. There he has sponsored visits from teachers of all four schools of Tibetan Buddhism diaspora, including the Dalai Lama, Sakya Trizin, Gyalwa Karmapa Rangjung Rigpe Dorje, Dudjom Rinpoche, Dilgo Khyentse Rinpoche, Kalu Rinpoche, Dezhung Rinpoche, Chögyam Trungpa, Ganden Trisur Rinpoche, Kyabje Zong Rinpoche and many other acclaimed masters.

Lama Kunga has also taught in New Jersey, Washington D.C., Wisconsin, Oregon, Florida, Utah, San Diego, Minnesota, and Arkansas.

== Bibliography ==
Lama Kunga authored the following books:

- Drinking the Mountain Stream: Songs of Tibet's Beloved Saint, Milarepa - with Brian Cutillo ISBN 0-86171-063-0
- Miraculous Journey New Stories and Songs by Milarepa - with Brian Cutillo,
- In the Presence of My Enemies : Memoirs of Tibetan Nobleman Tsipon Shuguba, - with Sumner Carnahan. This is the biography of his father
