= Brian Cutillo =

American scholar and translator

Brian A. Cutillo
- Born: 1945
- Died: 2006
- Occupation: Translator

Brian A. Cutillo (1945–2006) was an American scholar and translator in the field of Tibetan Buddhism. He was also an accomplished neuro-cognitive scientist, musician, anthropologist and textile weaver.

== Studies at MIT ==
Cutillo was a graduate of the Massachusetts Institute of Technology majoring in physics (1967).

While at MIT, Cutillo wrote the music for a 1967 production of At the Hawk’s Well by William Butler Yeats for An Evening of One Act Plays presented October 14–15, 1966.

Cutillo provided the cultural background and translations for the recording "The Music of Tibet". The recordings were made by Huston Smith, then Professor of Philosophy at MIT, in 1964. Smith provided an interpretation. The recording was reviewed in the journal Ethnomusicology in 1972.

== Studies with Geshe Wangyal ==
Cutillo was introduced to Ngawang Wangyal while a student at MIT. He became one of his earliest American students. Ngawang Wangyal wrote the book The Door of Liberation published by Maurice Girodias Associates, Inc., (1973).

Ngawang Wangyal and Cutillo also translated the Illuminations of Sakya Pandita.

== Milarepa translations ==
Cutillo's best known work includes two books of Milarepa poems translated with Kunga Rinpoche, Drinking the Mountain Stream and Miraculous Journey.

When starting the Lotsawa publishing company to publish these two collections of songs, Cutillo was also instrumental in publishing important works by H.V. Guenther (The Creative Vision) and Longchenpa (You Are the Eyes of the World).

== The Turquoise Bee ==
Cutillo translated The Turquoise Bee with Rick Fields. These were the love songs of the 6th Dalai Lama. The book includes Ume calligraphy by Cutillo and a drawing by Mayumi Oda.

== Tibetan translations ==
Cutillo translated scholarly Tibetan Buddhism Abhidharma texts that remained unpublished at his death. Some of these translations are now being completed for publication under the auspices, among others, of the Infinity Foundation. They were started some 35 years ago in collaboration with Dr. Robert Thurman.

The following texts in rough draft form needing further work for publication in the mid-future: [...] Abhidharma-samuccaya by Asanga (Thurman and Cutillo); Samdhinirmocana-sutra (Thurman and Cutillo).

== Research in human cognitive neuroscience ==
Cutillo worked with his MIT classmate, Dr. Alan Gevins, in the early days of the EEG Systems Lab in San Francisco. Cutillo co-authored with Dr. Gevins, and others, numerous scientific research papers including 3 papers published in Science, the Journal of the American Association for the Advancement of Science. Along with a paper from the EEG Systems Lab in Science in 1979, these 3 papers helped usher in the modern era of cognitive neuroscience by reporting advanced computerized methods of measuring the electrical signals in the human brain reflecting fundamental cognitive processes of attention.

- Gevins, A.S., Morgan, N.H., Bressler, S.L., Cutillo, B.A., White, R.M., Illes, J., Greer, D.S., Doyle, J.C. & Zeitlin, G.M. (1987). Human neuroelectric patterns predict performance accuracy. Science, 235, 580–585.
- Gevins, A.S., Schaffer, R.E., Doyle, J.C., Cutillo, B.A., Tannehill, R.L. & Bressler, S.L. (1983). Shadows of thought: Shifting lateralization of human brain electrical patterns during brief visuomotor task. Science, 220, 97–99.
- Gevins, A.S., Doyle, J.C., Cutillo, B.A., Schaffer, R.E., Tannehill, R.S., Ghannam, J.H., Gilcrease, V.A. & Yeager, C.L. (1981). Electrical potentials in human brain during cognition: New method reveals dynamic patterns of correlation. Science, 213, 918–922.

== Textile endeavors ==
Cutillo wove textiles on a manual floor loom based on early American heirloom patterns. Many of those weavings, including those in the photographs, are in private collections.

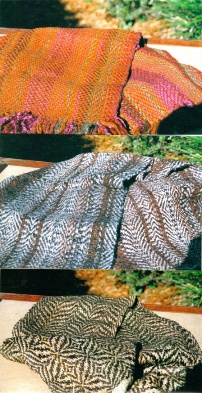

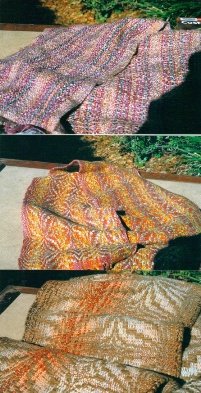

== Death ==
Cutillo died January 4, 2006, in Tulare, California.
