= Anekantavada =

Jain doctrine of many-sidedness

Anekāntavāda (Sanskrit: अनेकान्तवाद, "many-sidedness") is the Jain doctrine about metaphysical truths that emerged in ancient India. It states that the ultimate truth and reality is complex and has multiple aspects and viewpoints.

According to Jainism, no single, specific statement can describe the nature of existence and the absolute truth. This knowledge (Kevala Jnana), it adds, is comprehended only by the Arihants. Other beings and their statements about absolute truth are incomplete, and at best a partial truth. All knowledge claims, according to the anekāntavāda doctrine must be qualified in many ways, including being affirmed and denied. Anekāntavāda is a fundamental doctrine of Jainism.

The origins of anekāntavāda can be traced back to the teachings of Mahāvīra (599–527 BCE), the 24th Jain Tīrthankara, and the predecessor Tirthankars. The dialectical concepts of syādvāda "conditioned viewpoints" and nayavāda "partial viewpoints" were expounded and illustrated from anekāntavāda in the medieval era, providing Jainism with more detailed logical structure and expression. The details of the doctrine emerged in Jainism in the 1st millennium CE, from debates between scholars of Jain, Buddhist and Vedic schools of philosophies.

Anekantavada has also been interpreted to mean non-absolutism, "intellectual Ahimsa", religious pluralism, as well as a rejection of fanaticism that leads to terror attacks and mass violence. Some scholars state that modern revisionism has attempted to reinterpret anekantavada with religious tolerance, openmindedness and pluralism. The word may be literally translated as “non-one-sidedness doctrine,” or “the doctrine of not-one-side.”

== Etymology ==
The word anekāntavāda is a compound of two Sanskrit words: anekānta and vāda. The word anekānta itself is composed of three root words, "an" (not), "eka" (one) and "anta" (end, side), together it connotes "not one ended, sided", "many-sidedness", or "manifoldness". The word vāda means "doctrine, way, speak, thesis". The term anekāntavāda is translated by scholars as the doctrine of "many-sidedness", "non-onesidedness", or "many pointedness".

The term anekāntavāda is not found in early texts considered canonical by Svetambara tradition of Jainism. However, traces of the doctrines are found in comments of Mahavira in these Svetambara texts, where he states that the finite and infinite depends on one's perspective. The word anekantavada was coined by Acharya Siddhasen Divakar to denote the teachings of Mahavira that state truth can be expressed in infinite ways. The earliest comprehensive teachings of anekāntavāda doctrine is found in the Tattvarthasutra by Acharya Umaswami, and is considered to be authoritative by all Jain sects. In the Digambara tradition texts, the 'two-truths theory' of Kundakunda also provides the core of this doctrine.

== Philosophical overview ==
The doctrine of anekāntavāda, also called anekāntatva, holds that truth and reality are complex and always have multiple aspects. Reality can be experienced, but it cannot be fully expressed with language. Human attempts to communicate are naya, or "partial expression of the truth". Language is not truth, but a means to express it. According to Mahāvīra, language proceeds from truth, not the reverse. For example, one can experience the truth of a taste, but cannot fully express that taste through language. Any attempts to express the experience are syāt, or valid "in some respect" but it still remains a "perhaps, just one perspective, incomplete". In the same way, spiritual truths are complex, they have multiple aspects, language cannot express their plurality, yet with effort and appropriate karma they can be experienced.

The anekāntavāda premises of the Jains are ancient, as evidenced by references to them in Buddhist texts such as the Samaññaphala Sutta. The Jain āgamas suggest that Mahāvīra's approach to all metaphysical and philosophical questions was a "qualified yes" (syāt). These texts identify the anekāntavāda doctrine as one of the key differences between the teachings of Mahāvīra and those of the Buddha. The Buddha taught the Middle Way, rejecting the extremes of sense indulgence and self-mortification, and took no position on certain metaphysical questions, such as whether the Tathāgata exists after death or not, showing such questions to be based on wrong views and therefore invalid. Mahāvīra, in contrast, taught his followers to accept both "it is" and "it is not", with "from a viewpoint" qualification and with reconciliation to understand the absolute reality. Syādvāda (predication logic) and Nayavāda (perspective epistemology) expand on the concept of anekāntavāda within Jainism. Syādvāda recommends the expression of anekānta by prefixing the epithet syād to every phrase or expression describing the nature of existence.

The Jain doctrine of anekāntavāda, according to Bimal Matilal, states that "no philosophic or metaphysical proposition can be true if it is asserted without any condition or limitation". For a metaphysical proposition to be true, according to Jainism, it must include one or more conditions (syadvada) or limitations (nayavada, standpoints).

=== Syādvāda ===
Syādvāda (Sanskrit: स्याद्वाद) is the theory of conditioned predication, the first part of which is derived from the Sanskrit word syāt (Sanskrit: स्यात्), which is the third person singular of the optative tense of the Sanskrit verb as (Sanskrit: अस्), 'to be', and which becomes syād when followed by a vowel or a voiced consonant, in accordance with sandhi. The optative tense in Sanskrit (formerly known as the 'potential') has the same meaning as the present tense of the subjunctive mood in most Indo-European languages, including Hindi, Latin, Russian, French, etc. It is used when there is uncertainty in a statement; not 'it is', but 'it may be', 'one might', etc. The subjunctive is very commonly used in Hindi, for example, in 'kya kahun?', 'what to say?'. The subjunctive is also commonly used in conditional constructions; for example, one of the few English locutions in the subjunctive which remains more or less current is 'were it ०, then ०', or, more commonly, 'if it were..', where 'were' is in the past tense of the subjunctive.

Syat can be translated into English as meaning "perchance, may be, perhaps" (it is). The use of the verb 'as' in the optative tense is found in the more ancient Vedic era literature in a similar sense. For example, sutra 1.4.96 of Panini's Astadhyayi explains it as signifying "a chance, maybe, probable".

In Jainism, however, syadvada and anekanta is not a theory of uncertainty, doubt or relative probabilities. Rather, it is "conditional yes or conditional approval" of any proposition, states Matilal and other scholars. This usage has historic precedents in classical Sanskrit literature, and particularly in other ancient Indian religions (Buddhism and Hinduism) with the phrase syad etat, meaning "let it be so, but", or "an answer that is 'neither yes nor no', provisionally accepting an opponent's viewpoint for a certain premise". This would be expressed in archaic English with the subjunctive: 'be it so', a direct translation of syad etat. Traditionally, this debate methodology was used by Indian scholars to acknowledge the opponent's viewpoint, but disarm and bound its applicability to certain context and persuade the opponent of aspects not considered.

According to Charitrapragya, in Jain context syadvada does not mean a doctrine of doubt or skepticism, rather it means "multiplicity or multiple possibilities". Syat in Jainism connotes something different from what the term means in Buddhism and Hinduism. In Jainism, it does not connote an answer that is "neither yes nor no", but it connotes a "many sidedness" to any proposition with a sevenfold predication.

Syādvāda is a theory of qualified predication, states Koller. It states that all knowledge claims must be qualified in many ways, because reality is many-sided. It is done so systematically in later Jain texts through saptibhaṅgīnaya or "the theory of sevenfold scheme". These saptibhaṅgī seem to have been first formulated in Jainism by the 5th or 6th century CE Svetambara scholar Mallavadin, and they are:

1. Affirmation: syād-asti—in some ways, it is,
2. Denial: syān-nāsti—in some ways, it is not,
3. Joint but successive affirmation and denial: syād-asti-nāsti—in some ways, it is, and it is not,
4. Joint and simultaneous affirmation and denial: syāt-asti-avaktavyaḥ—in some ways, it is, and it is indescribable,
5. Joint and simultaneous affirmation and denial: syān-nāsti-avaktavyaḥ—in some ways, it is not, and it is indescribable,
6. Joint and simultaneous affirmation and denial: syād-asti-nāsti-avaktavyaḥ—in some ways, it is, it is not, and it is indescribable,
7. Joint and simultaneous affirmation and denial: syād-avaktavyaḥ—in some ways, it is indescribable.

Each of these seven predicates state the Jain viewpoint of a multifaceted reality from the perspective of time, space, substance and mode. The phrase syāt declares the standpoint of expression – affirmation with regard to own substance (dravya), place (kṣetra), time (kāla), and being (bhāva), and negation with regard to other substance (dravya), place (kṣetra), time (kāla), and being (bhāva). Thus, for a ‘jar’, in regard to substance (dravya) – earthen, it simply is; wooden, it simply is not. In regard to place (kṣetra) – room, it simply is; terrace, it simply is not. In regard to time (kāla) – summer, it simply is; winter, it simply is not. In regard to being (bhāva) – brown, it simply is; white, it simply is not. And the word ‘simply’ has been inserted for the purpose of excluding a sense not approved by the ‘nuance’; for avoidance of a meaning not intended.

According to Samantabhadra's text Āptamīmāṁsā (Verse 105), "Syādvāda, the doctrine of conditional predications, and kevalajñāna (omniscience), are both illuminators of the substances of reality. The difference between the two is that while kevalajñāna illumines directly, syādvāda illumines indirectly". Syadvada is indispensable and helps establish the truth, according to Samantabhadra.

=== Nayavāda ===
Nayavāda (Sanskrit: नयवाद) is the theory of standpoints or viewpoints. Nayavāda is a compound of two Sanskrit words—naya ("standpoint, viewpoint, interpretation") and vāda ("doctrine, thesis"). Nayas are philosophical perspectives about a particular topic, and how to make proper conclusions about that topic.

According to Jainism, there are seven nayas or viewpoints through which one can make complete judgments about absolute reality using syadvada. These seven naya, according to Umaswati, are:

1. Naigama-naya: common sense or a universal view
2. Samgraha-naya: generic or class view that classifies it
3. Vyavahara-naya: pragmatic or a particular view assesses its utility
4. Rijusutra-naya: linear view considers it in present time
5. Sabda-naya: verbal view that names it
6. Samabhirudha-naya: etymological view uses the name and establishes it nature
7. Evambhuta-naya: actuality view considers its concrete particulars

The naya theory emerged after about the 5th century CE, and underwent extensive development in Jainism. There are many variants of nayavada concept in later Jain texts.

A particular viewpoint is called a naya or a partial viewpoint. According to Vijay Jain, Nayavada does not deny the attributes, qualities, modes and other aspects; but qualifies them to be from a particular perspective. A naya reveals only a part of the totality, and should not be mistaken for the whole. A synthesis of different viewpoints is said to be achieved by the doctrine of conditional predications (syādvāda).

=== Jiva, the changing soul ===
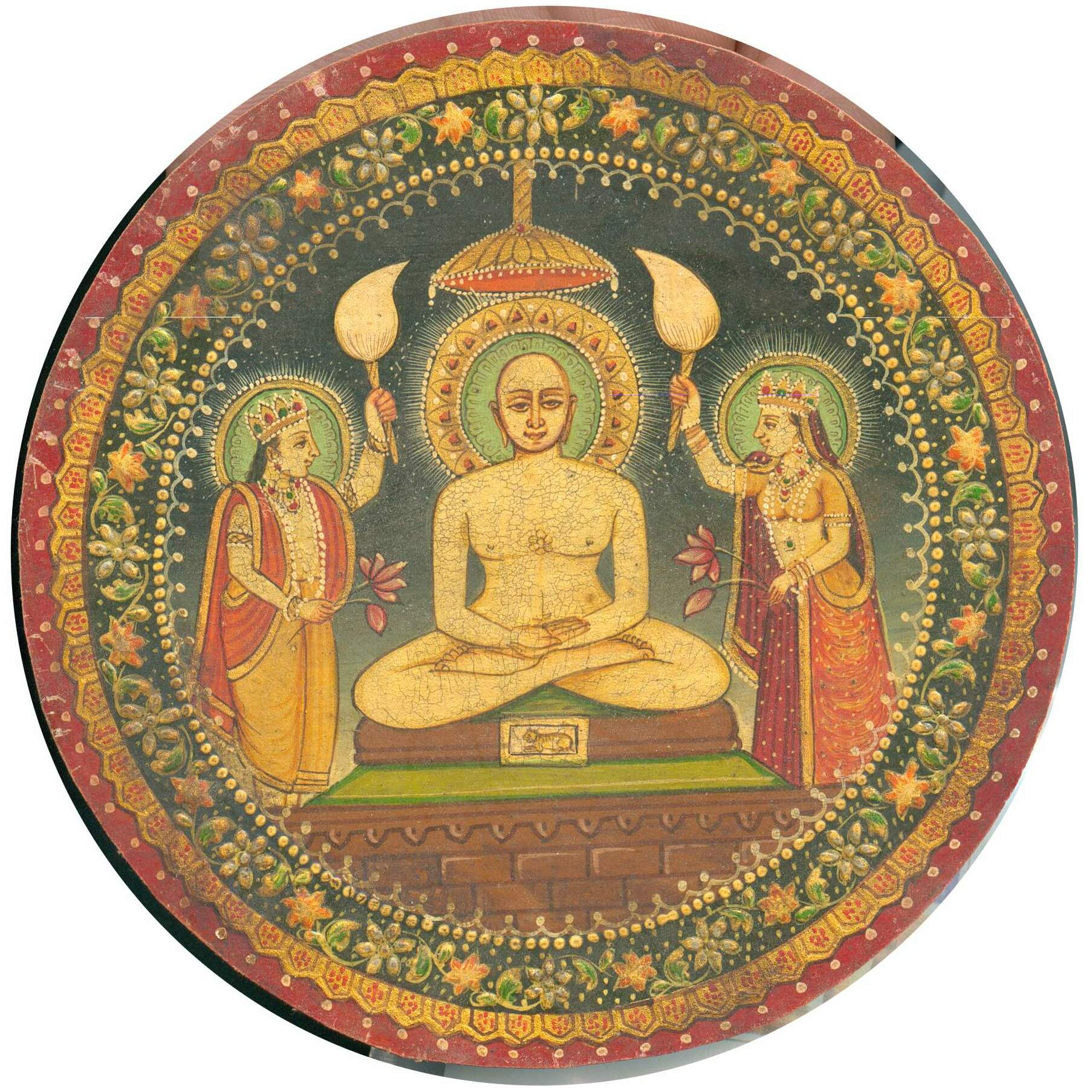
Mahāvīra did not use the word anekāntavada, but his teachings contain the seeds of the concept (painting from Rajasthan, ca. 1900)

Ancient India, particularly the centuries in which the Mahāvīra and the Buddha lived, was a ground of intense intellectual debates, especially on the nature of reality and self or soul. Jain view of soul differs from those found in ancient Buddhist and Hindu texts, and Jain view about jiva and ajiva (self, matter) utilizes anekāntavāda.

The Upanishadic thought (Hindu) postulated the impermanence of matter and body, but the existence of an unchanging, eternal metaphysical reality of Brahman and Ātman (soul, self). The Buddhist thought also postulated impermanence, but denied the existence of any unchanging, eternal soul or self and instead posited the concept of anātman (no-self). According to the Vedāntin (Upanishadic) conceptual scheme, the Buddhists were wrong in denying permanence and absolutism, and within the Buddhist conceptual scheme, the Vedāntins were wrong in denying the reality of impermanence. The two positions were contradictory and mutually exclusive from each other's point of view. The Jains managed a synthesis of the two uncompromising positions with anekāntavāda. From the perspective of a higher, inclusive level made possible by the ontology and epistemology of anekāntavāda and syādvāda, Jains do not see such claims as contradictory or mutually exclusive; instead, they are seen as ekantika or only partially true. The Jain breadth of vision embraces the perspectives of both Vedānta which, according to Jainism, "recognizes substances but not process", and Buddhism, which "recognizes process but not substance". Jainism, on the other hand, pays equal attention to both substance (dravya) and process (paryaya).

This philosophical syncretisation of paradox of change through anekānta has been acknowledged by modern scholars such as Arvind Sharma, who wrote:

Our experience of the world presents a profound paradox which we can ignore existentially, but not philosophically. This paradox is the paradox of change. Something – A changes and therefore it cannot be permanent. On the other hand, if A is not permanent, then what changes? In this debate between the "permanence" and "change", Hinduism seems more inclined to grasp the first horn of the dilemma and Buddhism the second. It is Jainism that has the philosophical courage to grasp both horns fearlessly and simultaneously, and the philosophical skill not to be gored by either.

=== Inclusivist or exclusivist ===
Some Indian writers state that Anekantavada is an inclusivist doctrine positing that Jainism accepts "non-Jain teachings as partial versions of truth", a form of sectarian tolerance. Others scholars state this is incorrect and a reconstruction of Jain history because Jainism has consistently seen itself in "exclusivist term as the one true path". Classical Jain scholars saw their premises and models of reality as superior to the competing spiritual traditions of Buddhism and Hinduism, both of which Jainism considered inadequate. For instance, the Jain text Uttaradhyayana Sutra in section 23.63 calls the competing Indian thought to be "heterodox and heretics" and that they "have chosen a wrong path, the right path is that taught by the Jinas". Similarly, the early Jain scholar Haribhadra, who likely lived between the 6th and 8th century, states that those who do not follow the teachings of Jainism cannot be "approved or accommodated".

John Koller states anekāntavāda to be "epistemological respect for view of others" about the nature of existence whether it is "inherently enduring or constantly changing", but "not relativism; it does not mean conceding that all arguments and all views are equal".

In contemporary times, according to Paul Dundas, the Anekantavada doctrine has been interpreted by some Jains as intending to "promote a universal religious tolerance", and a teaching of "plurality" and "benign attitude to other [ethical, religious] positions". This is problematic and a misreading of Jain historical texts and Mahāvīra's teachings, states Dundas. The "many pointedness, multiple perspective" teachings of the Mahāvīra is a doctrine about the nature of Absolute Reality and human existence, and it is sometimes called "non-absolutism" doctrine. However, it is not a doctrine about tolerating or condoning activities such as sacrificing or killing animals for food, violence against disbelievers or any other living being as "perhaps right". The Five vows for Jain monks and nuns, for example, are strict requirements and there is no "perhaps, just one perspective". Similarly, since ancient times, Jainism co-existed with Buddhism and Hinduism, according to Dundas, but Jainism was highly critical of the knowledge systems and ideologies of its rivals, and vice versa.

== History and development ==
The principle of anekāntavāda is one of the foundational Jain philosophical concepts. The development of anekāntavāda also encouraged the development of the dialectics of syādvāda (conditioned viewpoints) and nayavāda (partial viewpoints).

According to Karl Potter, the Jain anekāntavāda doctrine emerged in a milieu that included Buddhists and Hindus in ancient and medieval India. The diverse Hindu schools such as Nyaya-Vaisheshika, Samkhya-Yoga and Mimamsa-Vedanta, all accepted the premise of Atman, the "unchanging permanent soul, self exists and is self-evident", while various schools of early Buddhism denied it and substituted it with Anatta (no-self, no-soul). However, Shunyavada, the leading school of Buddhism, holds that there is no permanent soul and that all things are shunya (empty), arguing that those who witness everything are also shunya (emptiness). Further, for causation theories, Vedanta schools and Madhyamika Buddhists had similar ideas, while Nyaya-Vaisheshika and non-Madhyamika Buddhists generally agreed on the other side. Jainism, using its anekāntavāda doctrine occupied the center of this theological divide on soul-self (jiva) and causation theories, between the various schools of Buddhist and Hindu thought.

=== Origins ===
The origins of anekāntavāda are traceable in the teachings of Mahāvīra, who used it effectively to show the relativity of truth and reality. Taking a relativistic viewpoint, Mahāvīra is said to have explained the nature of the soul as both permanent, from the point of view of underlying substance, and temporary, from the point of view of its modes and modification.

=== Early history ===
Early Jain texts were not composed in Vedic or classical Sanskrit, but in Ardhamagadhi Prakrit language. According to Matilal, the earliest Jain literature that present a developing form of a substantial anekantavada doctrine is found in Sanskrit texts, and after Jaina scholars had adopted Sanskrit to debate their ideas with Buddhists and Hindus of their era. These texts show a synthetic development, the existence and borrowing of terminology, ideas and concepts from rival schools of Indian thought but with innovation and original thought that disagreed with their peers.

The early Svetambara canons and teachings do not use the terms anekāntavāda and syādvāda, but contain teachings in rudimentary form without giving it proper structure or establishing it as a separate doctrine. Śvētāmbara text, Sutrakritanga contains references to Vibhagyavāda, which, according to Hermann Jacobi, is the same as syādvāda and saptibhaṅgī. For example, Jacobi in his 1895 translation interpreted vibhagyavada as syadvada, the former mentioned in the Svetambara Jain canonical text Sutrakritanga. However, the Digambara Jains dispute this text is canonical or even authentic.

A monk should be modest, though he be of a fearless mind; he should expound the syādvāda, he should use the two permitted kinds of speech, living among virtuous men, impartial and wise.

— Sūtrakritānga, 14:22, A Svetambara text disputed by the Digambaras

According to Upadhyaye, the Bhagvatisūtra (also called Vyākhyāprajñapti) mentions three primary predications of the saptibhaṅgīnaya. This too is a Svetambara text, and considered by Digambara Jains as unauthentic.

The earliest comprehensive teachings of anekāntavāda doctrine is found in the Tattvarthasutra of Umasvati, considered to be authoritative by all Jain sects including Svetambara and Digambara. The century in which Umaswati lived is unclear, but variously placed by contemporary scholars to sometime between 2nd and 5th century.

The Digambara scholar Kundakunda, in his mystical Jain texts, expounded on the doctrine of syādvāda and saptibhaṅgī in Pravacanasāra and Pancastikayasāra. Kundakunda also used nayas to discuss the essence of the self in Samayasāra. Kundakunda is believed in the Digambara tradition to have lived about the 1st-century CE, but has been placed by early modern era scholars to 2nd or 3rd century CE. In contrast, the earliest available secondary literature on Kundakunda appears in about the 10th century, which has led recent scholarship to suggest that he may have lived in or after 8th-century. This radical reassessment in Kundakunda chronology, if accurate, would place his comprehensive theories on anekantavada to the late 1st millennium CE.

=== Parable of the blind men and an elephant ===
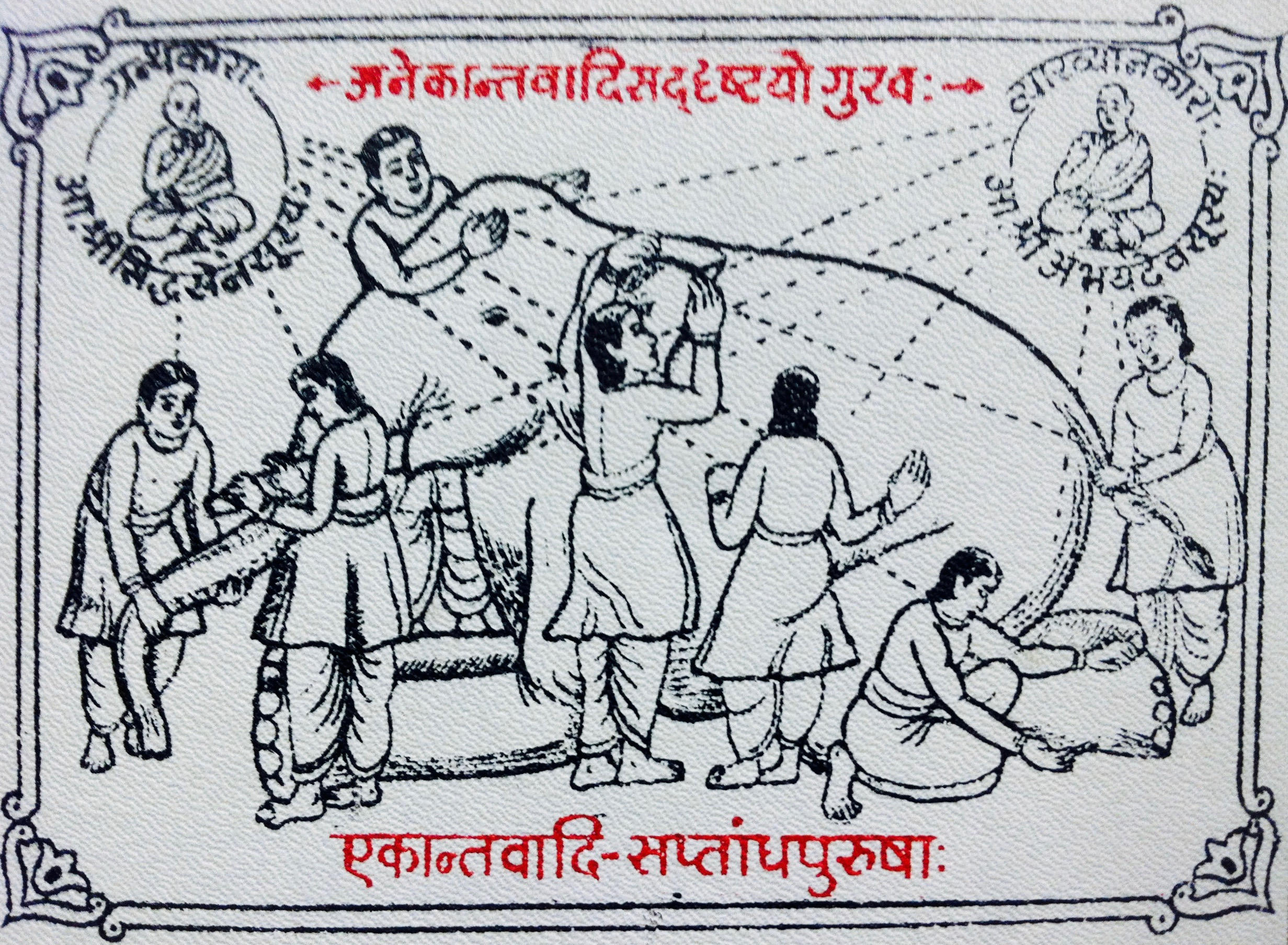
Seven blind men and an elephant parable

The Jain texts explain the anekāntvāda concept using the parable of blind men and an elephant, in a manner similar to those found in both Buddhist and Hindu texts about limits of perception and the importance of complete context. The parable has several Indian variations, but broadly goes as follows:

A group of blind men heard that a strange animal, called an elephant, had been brought to the town, but none of them were aware of its shape and form. Out of curiosity, they said: "We must inspect and know it by touch, of which we are capable". So, they sought it out, and when they found it they groped about it. In the case of the first person, whose hand landed on the trunk, said "This being is like a thick snake". For another one whose hand reached its ear, it seemed like a kind of fan. As for another person, whose hand was upon its leg, said, the elephant is a pillar like a tree-trunk. The blind man who placed his hand upon its side said, "elephant is a wall". Another who felt its tail, described it as a rope. The last felt its tusk, stating the elephant is that which is hard, smooth and like a spear.

This parable is called Andha-gaja-nyaya maxim in Jain texts.

Two of the Jain references to this parable are found in Tattvarthaslokavatika of Vidyanandi (9th century) and it appears twice in the Syādvādamanjari of Ācārya Mallisena (13th century). According to Mallisena, whenever anyone takes a partial, unconditional view of the ultimate reality, and denies the possibility of another aspect of that reality, it is an instance of the above parable and a defective view. Mallisena goes further in his second reference to the above parable and states that all reality has infinite aspects and attributes, all assertions can only be relatively true. This does not mean scepticism or doubt is the right path to knowledge, according to Mallisena and other Jain scholars, but that any philosophical assertion is only conditionally, partially true. Any and all viewpoints, states Mallisena, that do not admit an exception are false views.

While the same parable is found in Buddhist and Hindu texts to emphasize the need to be watchful for partial viewpoints of a complex reality, the Jain text apply it to isolated topic and all subjects. For example, the syadvada principle states that all the following seven predicates must be accepted as true for a cooking pot, according to Matilal:

- from a certain point of view, or in a certain sense, the pot exists
- from a certain point of view, the pot does not exist
- from a certain point of view, the pot exists and does not exist
- from a certain point of view, the pot is inexpressible
- from a certain point of view, the pot both exists and is inexpressible
- from a certain point of view, the pot both does not exist and is inexpressible
- from a certain point of view, the pot exists, does not exist, and is also inexpressible

=== Medieval developments ===
Ācārya Haribhadra (8th century CE) was one of the leading proponents of anekāntavāda. He wrote a doxography, a compendium of a variety of intellectual views. This attempted to contextualise Jain thoughts within the broad framework, rather than espouse narrow partisan views. It interacted with the many possible intellectual orientations available to Indian thinkers around the 8th century.

Ācārya Amrtacandra starts his famous 10th century CE work Purusathasiddhiupaya with strong praise for anekāntavāda: "I bow down to the principle of anekānta, the source and foundation of the highest scriptures, the dispeller of wrong one-sided notions, that which takes into account all aspects of truth, reconciling diverse and even contradictory traits of all objects or entity."

Ācārya Vidyānandi (11th century CE) provides the analogy of the ocean to explain the nature of truth in Tattvarthaslokavārtikka, 116:

Yaśovijaya Gaṇi, a 17th-century Jain monk, went beyond anekāntavāda by advocating madhāyastha, meaning "standing in the middle" or "equidistance". This position allowed him to praise qualities in others even though the people were non-Jain and belonged to other faiths. There was a period of stagnation after Yasovijayaji, as there were no new contributions to the development of Jain philosophy.

== Influence ==
The Jain philosophical concept of Anekantavada made important contributions to ancient Indian philosophy, in the areas of skepticism and relativity. The epistemology of anekāntavāda and syādvāda also had a profound impact on the development of ancient Indian logic and philosophy.

While employing anekāntavāda, the 17th century Jain scholar Yasovijaya stated that it is not anābhigrahika (indiscriminate attachment to all views as being true), which is effectively a kind of misconceived relativism. In Jain belief, anekāntavāda transcends the various traditions of Buddhism and Hinduism.

=== Role in Jain history ===
Anekāntavāda played a role in the history of Jainism in India, during intellectual debates from Śaivas, Vaiṣṇavas, Buddhists, Muslims, and Christians at various times. According to John Koller, professor of Asian studies, anekāntavāda allowed Jain thinkers to maintain the validity of their doctrine, while at the same time respectfully criticizing the views of their opponents. In other cases, it was a tool used by Jaina scholars to confront and dispute Buddhist scholars in ancient India, or in the case of Haribhadra justify the retaliation of the killing of his two nephews by Buddhist monks, with capital punishment for all Buddhist monks in the suspected monastery, according to the Buddhist version of Haribhadra's biography.

There is historical evidence that along with intolerance of non-Jains, Jains in their history have also been tolerant and generous just like Buddhists and Hindus. Their texts have never presented a theory for holy war. Jains and their temples have historically procured and preserved the classic manuscripts of Buddhism and Hinduism, a strong indicator of acceptance and plurality. The combination of historic facts, states Cort, suggest that Jain history is a combination of tolerance and intolerance of non-Jain views, and that it is inappropriate to rewrite the Jainism past as a history of "benevolence and tolerance" towards others.

=== Mohandas Karamchand Gandhi ===
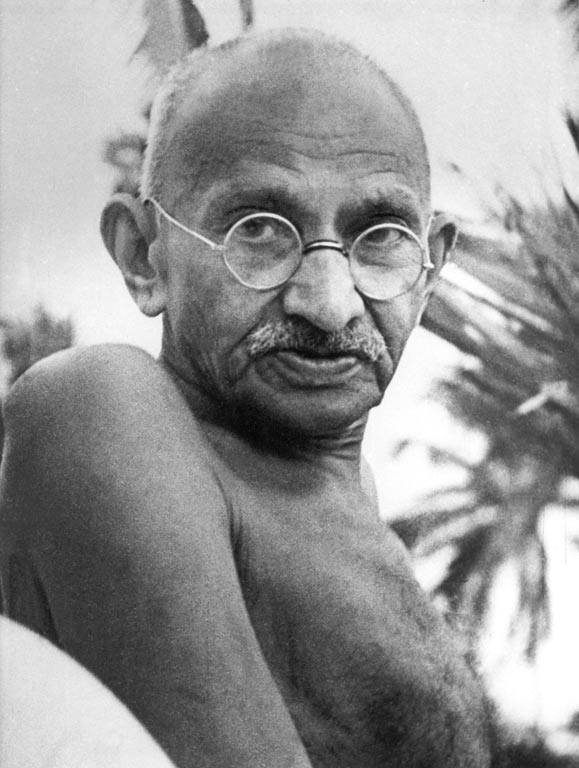
Gandhi used the Jain concept of Anekantavada to explain his views.

Mahatma Gandhi mentioned Anekantavada and Syadvada in the journal Young India – 21 Jan 1926. According to Jeffery D. Long – a scholar of Hindu and Jain studies, the Jain Syadvada doctrine helped Gandhi explain how he reconciled his commitment to the "reality of both the personal and impersonal aspects of Brahman", and his view of "Hindu religious pluralism":

I am an Advaitist and yet I can support Dvaitism (dualism). The world is changing every moment, and is therefore unreal, it has no permanent existence. But though it is constantly changing, it has a something about it which persists and it is therefore to that extent real. I have therefore no objection to calling it real and unreal, and thus being called an Anekāntavadi or a Syādvadi. But my Syādvāda is not the Syādvāda of the learned, it is peculiarly my own. I cannot engage in a debate with them. It has been my experience that I am always true from my point of view, and am often wrong from the point of view of my honest critics. I know that we are both right from our respective points of view. And this knowledge saves me from attributing motives to my opponents or critics. (...) My Anekāntavāda is the result of the twin doctrine of Satyagraha and ahiṃsā.

=== Against religious intolerance and contemporary terrorism ===
Referring to the September 11 attacks, John Koller states that the threat to life from religious violence in modern society mainly exists due to faulty epistemology and metaphysics as well as faulty ethics. A failure to respect the life of other human beings and other life forms, states Koller, is "rooted in dogmatic but mistaken knowledge claims that fail to recognize other legitimate perspectives". Koller states that anekāntavāda is a Jain doctrine that each side commit to accepting truths of multiple perspectives, dialogue and negotiations.

According to Sabine Scholz, the application of the Anekantavada as a religious basis for "intellectual Ahimsa" is a modern era reinterpretation, one attributed to the writings of A.B. Dhruva in 1933. This view states that Anekantavada is an expression of "religious tolerance of other opinions and harmony". In the 21st century, some writers have presented it as an intellectual weapon against "intolerance, fundamentalism and terrorism". Other scholars such as John E. Cort and Paul Dundas state that, while Jainism indeed teaches non-violence as the highest ethical value, the reinterpretation of Anekantavada as "religious tolerance of other opinions" is a "misreading of the original doctrine". In Jain history, it was a metaphysical doctrine and a philosophical method to formulate its distinct ascetic practice of liberation. Jain history shows, to the contrary, that it persistently was harshly critical and intolerant of Buddhist and Hindu spiritual theories, beliefs and ideologies. John Cort states that the Anekantavada doctrine in pre-20th century Jain literature had no relation to religious tolerance or "intellectual Ahimsa". Jain intellectual and social history toward non-Jains, according to Cort, has been contrary to the modern revisionist attempts, particularly by diaspora Jains, to present "Jains having exhibited a spirit of understanding and tolerance toward non-Jains", or that Jains were rare or unique in practicing religious tolerance in Indian intellectual history. According to Padmanabha Jaini, states Cort, indiscriminate open mindedness and the approach of "accepting all religious paths as equally correct when in fact they are not" is an erroneous view in Jainism and not supported by the Anekantavada doctrine.

According to Paul Dundas, in and after the 12th century, the persecution and violence against Jains by Muslim state caused Jain scholars to revisit their theory of Ahimsa (non-violence). For example, Jinadatta Suri in 12th century, wrote during a time of widespread destruction of Jain temples and blocking of Jaina pilgrimage by Muslim armies, that "anybody engaged in a religious activity who was forced to fight and kill somebody" in self-defense would not lose any merit. N.L. Jain, quoting Acarya Mahaprajna, states Anekantavada doctrine is not a principle that can be applied to all situations or fields. In his view, the doctrine has its limits and Anekantavada doctrine does not mean intellectual tolerance or acceptance of religious violence, terrorism, taking of hostages, proxy wars such as in Kashmir, and that "to initiate a conflict is as sinful as to tolerate or not oppose it".

The reinterpretation of Anekantavada as a doctrine of religious tolerance is novel, popular but not unusual for contemporary Jains. It is a pattern of reinterpretation and reinvention to rebrand and reposition that is found in many religions, states Scholz.

== Comparison with non-Jain doctrines ==
Mapping the 7 Nayas (viewpoints) of Jainism to Indian Philosophies
Naya	Description (Perspective)	Example in Jain Explanation	Corresponding Indian Philosophy	Jain Critique on Philosophy
Naigama Naya	Teleological or purpose-based viewpoint; focuses on the general purpose without attending to specific details.	A mango is meant to be eaten or juiced, irrespective of its ripeness or exact color.	Nyāya, Mīmāṁsā (focus on rituals/duties as essential purpose of life)	Overlooks the distinct intrinsic properties of entities beyond their utility or purpose.
Sangraha Naya	Generic or collective viewpoint; emphasizes classification or oneness based on shared qualities.	Mango, pineapple, banana: all are 'fruits', ignoring their differences.	Advaita Vedanta (Everything is Brahman — pure consciousness) and Samkhya	Ignores diversity; dismisses individuality and multiplicity of non conscious substances like matter, space, time, which have distinct natures.
Vyavahāra Naya	Practical, conventional viewpoint; understanding things as they are perceived and used in daily life.	A ripe mango is sweet and ready to eat.	Nyāya, Vaiśeṣika (World is real, known via logic and categorization) or Cārvāka	Misses deeper truths beyond practicality; tends towards realism without accounting for deeper or changing realities.
Ruju-sutra Naya	Momentary, state-specific viewpoint; focuses on the current, dynamic condition of an object.	Mango is yellowish now but might be overripe tomorrow.	Buddhism (Theravāda, Madhyamaka) (Everything is impermanent, no abiding self)	Overemphasizes transience, denies the underlying continuity or persistent substratum like the soul (jīva), matter (pudgala).
Shabda Naya	Based on linguistic meaning; focuses on understanding through words, terms, and conventions.	The word 'mango' and its meaning as per language.	Buddhist Madhyamaka (via linguistic deconstruction; Nāgārjuna's analysis of emptiness through language) or Grammar-based schools	Language is important but doesn’t fully capture ontological reality. Reliance on language can lead to verbalism detached from reality.
Samabhirudha Naya	Etymological and strict meaning-based viewpoint; focuses on precise definitions and correct usage of terms.	'Mango' should denote only a specific species, not any yellow fruit.	Nyāya, Grammar-based schools	Too fixated on linguistic precision, may lose broader experiential truths.
Evambhūta Naya	Functionality-based viewpoint; an entity is defined by its function or activity.	Only when mango is eaten or juiced, it fulfills its 'mango-ness'.	Mīmāṁsā (Rituals define dharma — things exist meaningfully when in action)	Reduces entities to their function alone, ignoring their essence or potential beyond functional use.
Summary: This table illustrates how each naya (standpoint) corresponds to a particular philosophical tendency when taken in isolation. While each school captures a partial truth, Jainism's doctrine of Anekāntavāda integrates all perspectives to present a holistic, non-absolutist understanding of reality. Jainism emphasizes that truth is multifaceted and can only be comprehended fully by synthesizing diverse viewpoints. Ultimately, however, the absolute truth (kevala-jñāna) is accessible only to the omniscient souls (Kevalajñānis), who perceive reality in its entirety, beyond all partial standpoints.

According to Bhagchandra Jain, one difference between the Buddhist and Jain views is that "Jainism accepts all statements to possess some relative (anekāntika) truth" while for Buddhism this is not the case.

In Jainism, states Jayatilleke, "no proposition could in theory be asserted to be categorically true or false, irrespective of the standpoint from which it was made, in Buddhism such categorical assertions were considered possible in the case of some propositions." Unlike Jainism, there are propositions that are categorically true in Buddhism, and there are others that are anekamsika (uncertain, indefinite). Examples of categorically true and certain doctrines are the Four Noble Truths, while examples of the latter in Buddhism are the avyakata-theses. Further, unlike Jainism, Buddhism does not have a Nayavāda doctrine.

According to Karl Potter and other scholars, Hinduism developed various theory of relations such as satkaryavada, asatkaryavada, avirodhavada and others. The anekantavada overlaps with two major theories found in Hindu and Buddhist thought, according to James Lochtefeld. The Anekantavada doctrine is satkaryavada in explaining causes, and the asatkaryavada in explaining qualities or attributes in the effects. The different schools of Hindu philosophy further elaborated and refined the theory of pramanas and the theory of relations to establish correct means to structure propositions in their view.

== Criticism ==
Indologists such as professor John E. Cort state that anekāntavāda is a doctrine that was historically used by Jain scholars not to accept other viewpoints, but to insist on the Jain viewpoint. Jain monks used anekāntavāda and syādvāda as debating weapons to silence their critics and defend the Jain doctrine. According to Paul Dundas, in Jain hands, this method of analysis became "a fearsome weapon of philosophical polemic with which the doctrines of Hinduism and Buddhism could be pared down to their ideological bases of simple permanence and impermanence, respectively, and thus could be shown to be one-pointed and inadequate as the overall interpretations of reality they purported to be". The Jain scholars, however, considered their own theory of Anekantavada self-evident, immune from criticism, needing neither limitations nor conditions.

The doctrines of anekāntavāda and syādavāda are often criticised to denying any certainty, or accepting incoherent contradictory doctrines. Another argument against it, posited by medieval era Buddhists and Hindus applied the principle on itself, that is if nothing is definitely true or false, is anekāntavāda true or false?

According to Karl Potter, the Anekantavada doctrine accepts the norm in Indian philosophies that all knowledge is contextual, that object and subject are interdependent. However, as a theory of relations, it does not solve the deficiencies in other progress philosophies, just "compounds the felony by merely duplicating the already troublesome notion of a dependence relation".

=== Hindu philosophies ===
==== Nyaya ====
The Nyaya school criticized the Jain doctrine of anekantavada, states Karl Potter, as "wanting to say one thing at one time, the other at another", thereby ignoring the principle of non-contradiction. The Naiyayikas states that it makes no sense to simultaneously say, "jiva and ajiva are not related" and "jiva and ajiva are related". Jains state that jiva attaches itself to karmic particles (ajiva) which means there is a relation between ajiva and jiva. The Jain theory of ascetic salvation teaches cleansing of karmic particles and destroying the bound ajiva to the jiva, yet, Jain scholars also deny that ajiva and jiva are related or at least interdependent, according to the Nyaya scholars. The Jain theory of anekantavada makes its theory of karma, asceticism and salvation incoherent, according to Nyaya texts.

==== Vaisheshika ====
The Vaisheshika and Shaivism school scholar Vyomashiva criticized the Anekantavada doctrine because, according to him, it makes all moral life and spiritual pursuits for moksha meaningless. Any spiritually liberated person must be considered under Anekantavada doctrine to be [a] both liberated and not liberated from one point of view, and [b] simply not liberated from another point of view, since all assertions are to be qualified and conditional under it. In other words, states Vyomashiva, this doctrine leads to a paradox and circularity.

==== Vedanta ====
Anekāntavāda was analyzed and critiqued by Adi Śankarācārya (~800 CE) in his bhasya on Brahmasutra (2:2:33–36): He stated that anekantavada doctrine when applied to philosophy suffers from two problems: virodha (contradictions) and samsaya (dubiety), neither of which it is able to reconcile with objectivity.

It is impossible that contradictory attributes such as being and non-being should at the same time belong to one and the same thing; just as observation teaches us that a thing cannot be hot and cold at the same moment. The third alternative expressed in the words — they either are such or not such — results in cognition of indefinite nature, which is no more a source of true knowledge than doubt is. Thus the means of knowledge, the object of knowledge, the knowing subject, and the act of knowledge become all alike indefinite. How can his followers act on a doctrine, the matter of which is altogether indeterminate? The result of your efforts is perfect knowledge and is not perfect knowledge. Observation shows that, only when a course of action is known to have a definite result, people set about it without hesitation. Hence a man who proclaims a doctrine of altogether indefinite contents does not deserve to be listened any more than a drunken or a mad man.

— Adi Shankara, Brahmasutra, 2.2:33–36

Shankara's criticism of anekantavada extended beyond the arguments of it being incoherent epistemology in ontological matters. According to Shankara, the goal of philosophy is to identify one's doubts and remove them through reason and understanding, not get more confused. The problem with anekantavada doctrine is that it compounds and glorifies confusion. Further, states Shankara, Jains use this doctrine to be "certain that everything is uncertain".

Contemporary scholars, states Piotr Balcerowicz, concur that the Jain doctrine of Anekantavada does reject some versions of the "law of non-contradiction", but it is incorrect to state that it rejects this law in all instances.

=== Buddhist philosophy ===
The Buddhist scholar Śāntarakṣita, and his student Kamalasila, criticized anekantavada by presenting his arguments that it leads to the Buddhist premise "jivas (souls) do not exist". That is, two of the most important doctrines of Jainism are mutually contradictory premises. According to Santaraksita, Jains state that "jiva is one considered collectively, and many considered distributively", but if so debates Santaraksita, "jiva cannot change". He then proceeds to show that changing jiva necessarily means jiva appear and disappear every moment, which is equivalent to "jiva don't exist". According to Karl Potter, the argument posited by Śāntarakṣita is flawed, because it commits what is called in the Western logic as the fallacy of division.

The Buddhist logician Dharmakirti critiqued anekāntavāda as follows:

With the differentiation removed, all things have dual nature. Then, if somebody is implored to eat curd, then why he does not eat camel?" The insinuation is obvious; if curd exists from the nature of curd and does not exist from the nature of a camel, then one is justified in eating camel, as by eating camel, he is merely eating the negation of curd.

— Dharmakirti, Pramānavarttikakārika

=== Self-criticism in Jain scholarship ===
The medieval era Jain logicians Akalanka and Vidyananda, who were likely contemporaries of Adi Shankara, acknowledged many issues with anekantavada in their texts. For example, Akalanka in his Pramanasamgraha acknowledges seven problems when anekantavada is applied to develop a comprehensive and consistent philosophy: dubiety, contradiction, lack of conformity of bases (vaiyadhi karanya), joint fault, infinite regress, intermixture and absence. Vidyananda acknowledged six of those in the Akalanka list, adding the problem of vyatikara (cross breeding in ideas) and apratipatti (incomprehensibility). Prabhācandra, who probably lived in the 11th century, and several other later Jain scholars accepted many of these identified issues in anekantavada application.

== See also ==
- Problem of universals
- Contextualism
- Degrees of truth
- E-Prime
- False dilemma
- Indian logic
- Jain epistemology
- Jaina seven-valued logic
- Logical disjunction
- Logical equality
- Logical value
- Multiplicities
- Multi-valued logic
- Perspectivism of Nietzsche.
- Pluralism
- Pratītyasamutpāda
- Principle of bivalence
- Propositional logic
- Relativism
- Rhizome (philosophy)
- Value pluralism
