= Treasure of Logic on Valid Cognition =

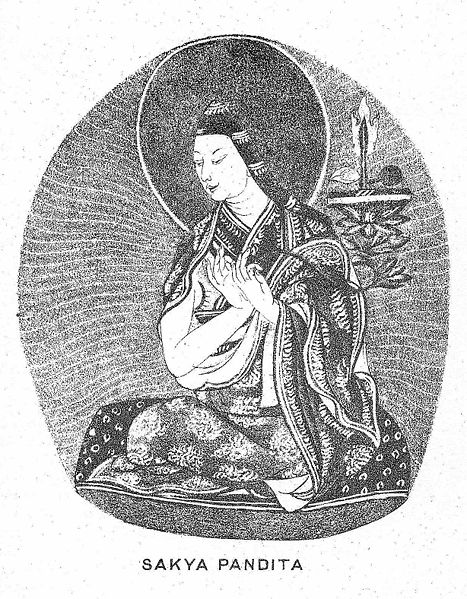
Treasure of Logic on Valid Cognition (ལེགས་པར་བཤད་པ་རིན་པོ་ཆེའི་བསྟན་བཅོས་བཞུགས་སོ།)

"Treasure of Logic on Valid Cognition" (Standard Tibetan: ལེགས་པར་བཤད་པ་རིན་པོ་ཆེའི་བསྟན་བཅོས་བཞུགས་སོ།; sanskr. Subhashitaratnanidhi) is an aphoristic tractate that is considered to be dogmatic. It was written in the beginning of the 13th century by Tibetan spiritual leader and Buddhist scholar Sakya Pandita. One of the most popular tractates in medieval Tibet and Mongolia.

== Structure of tractate ==
Treasure of Logic on Valid Cognition consists of 457 poetic aphorisms divided into 9 chapters by thematic features:

- Reflections about wise people (1–30)
- Reflections about noble people (31–58)
- Reflections about ignorant people (59–101)
- Reflections of plural character (102–144)
- Reflections about misconduct (145–192)
- Reflections about natural behavior (193–256)
- Reflections about inappropriate behavior (257–303)
- Reflections about deeds (304–398)
- Reflections about Dharma (399–457)

== Translations ==
- United Kingdom 1856 – English translation by Sándor Csoma de Kőrös
- France 1858 – French translation by Philippe Édouard Foucaux
- Germany 1926 – Germany translation by V.Campbell
- China 1958 – Chinese translation by Wan Yao
