= Sutrakritanga =

Information
- Religion: Jainism
- Period: 4th-3rd century BCE

Sūtrakṛtāṅga (सूत्रकृताङ्ग; also known in Prakrit as Sūyagaḍaṃga सूयगडंग) is the second Angas of the 12 main aṅgās of the Jain Svetambara canon. According to the Svetambara tradition it was written by Gandhara Sudharmasvami in Ardhamagadhi Prakrit.The text is in two main parts: the first in verse and the second in prose. It is written using techniques including narration and questions and answers, and the chapters start with Sudharmasvami explaining the various doctrines to his chief disciple Jambuswami and answering his questions.

According to Sagarmal Jain, the text dates c. 4th-3rd century BCE, but Johannes Bronkhorst argues that due to the Buddhist material contained within this text, it cannot be earlier than the 2nd century BCE.

== Description ==
This agama describes nonviolence, Jain metaphysics, and the refutation of other religious theories such as Kriyavada, Akriyavada, Ajnanavada, and Vinayavada. Sanskrit commentary has been done by Silanka who lived in the second half of the ninth century A.D. The agama is divided into two parts consisting of 16 lectures and 7 lectures respectively. Following are the diverse topics covered:

- Jain doctrine – Causes of bondage, description of hells, destruction of karmas etc.
- Conduct of Monks – Injunctions and prohibitions, difficulties faced, avoiding temptation of women etc.
- Heretical Doctrines and errors – Materialists, Fatalists and other wrong beliefs

== Quotes from Sutrakritanga Sutra ==
=== On destiny ===
Verse 30 declares a prevalent view on destiny: "Some hold that whatever pain and pleasure individuals beget are not the results of their own acts or volition nor due to others, but are due to destiny." In shloka 31 this belief is dispelled: "Those who brag thus are fools declaring themselves as learned, because they do not know that all pleasures or pains (or whatever happens) are not only due to destiny but they are due to destiny and also due to factors other than destiny."

=== On monks' conduct with women ===
Occasionally a woman will tempt him [a monk] to a comfortable couch or bed. But he should know these things to be as many traps under various disguises. He should not look at them, nor should he consent to anything inconsiderate, nor walk together with them; thus he will well guard himself. Inviting a monk and winning his confidence, they offer themselves to him. But he should know, and fly from these temptations in their various forms. 4.3-6

Meekly and politely they approach him with their manifold arts to win his heart; and talking sweetly in confidential conversation they make him do [what they like]. Those who are attached to this sinful [intercourse] must be reckoned among the wicked. Even a monk who practises severe austerities should avoid the company of women. 4.12

== Commentaries ==
- Sūtrakṛtāṅga Niryukti
- Sūtrakṛtāṅgacūrṇi by Jinadāsagaṇi
- Ṭīkā by Śīlaṅkācārya
- Dīpikā by Harṣakulagaṇi
- Dīpikā by Sādhuraṅga
- Sūtrakṛtāṅga Vārtika
- Sūtrakṛtāṅga Bālāvabodha

== English translations ==
- Jacobi, Hermann (1895). The Jaina Sutras, Part II.

== Sources ==
- Jain, Sagarmal (1998), "Jain Literature [From earliest time to c. 10th A.D.]", Aspects of Jainology: Volume VI
