= Indeterminacy =

Indeterminacy or underdeterminacy may refer to:

== Law ==
- Indeterminacy debate in legal theory
- Underdeterminacy (law)

== Linguistics ==
- Indeterminacy of translation
- Referential indeterminacy

== Philosophy ==
- Indeterminacy (philosophy)
- Indeterminism, the belief that not all events are causally determined
- Deterministic system (philosophy)
- Underdetermination

== Physics ==
- Quantum indeterminacy
- Uncertainty principle
- Scientific determinism

== Other ==
- Indeterminacy (literature) a literary term
- Indeterminacy in computation (disambiguation)
- Indeterminate system
- Aleatoric music and indeterminacy in music
- Statically indeterminate
- Underdetermined system
- In set theory and game theory, the opposite of determinacy
- In biology, indeterminate growth of an organism

== See also ==
- Nondeterminism (disambiguation)
- Determinism (disambiguation)
- Indeterminate (disambiguation)
