= Ājīvika =

School of Indian philosophy

Ājīvika

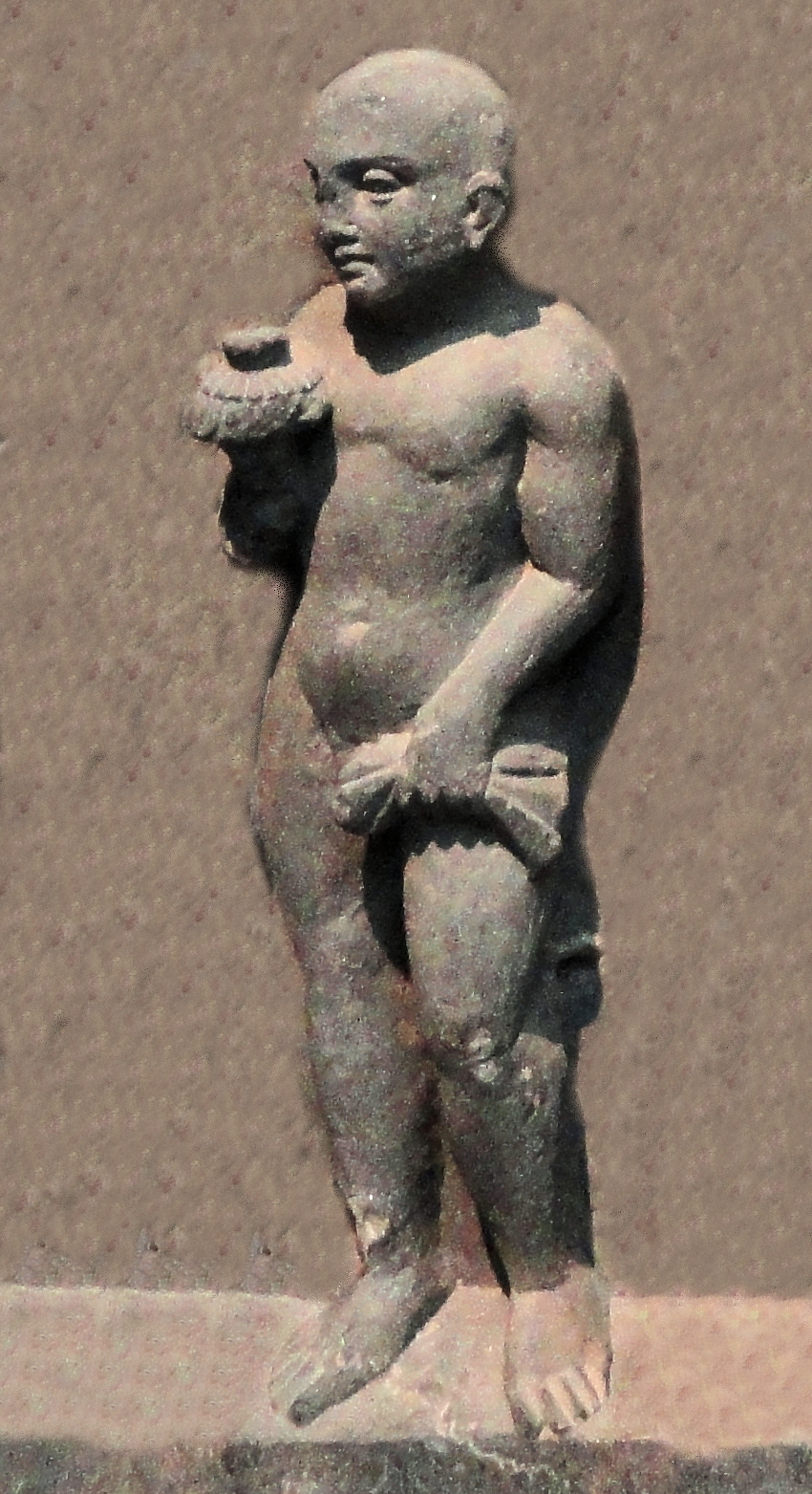
An Ājīvika ascetic in a Gandhara sculpture of the Mahaparinirvana, circa 2nd–3rd century CE

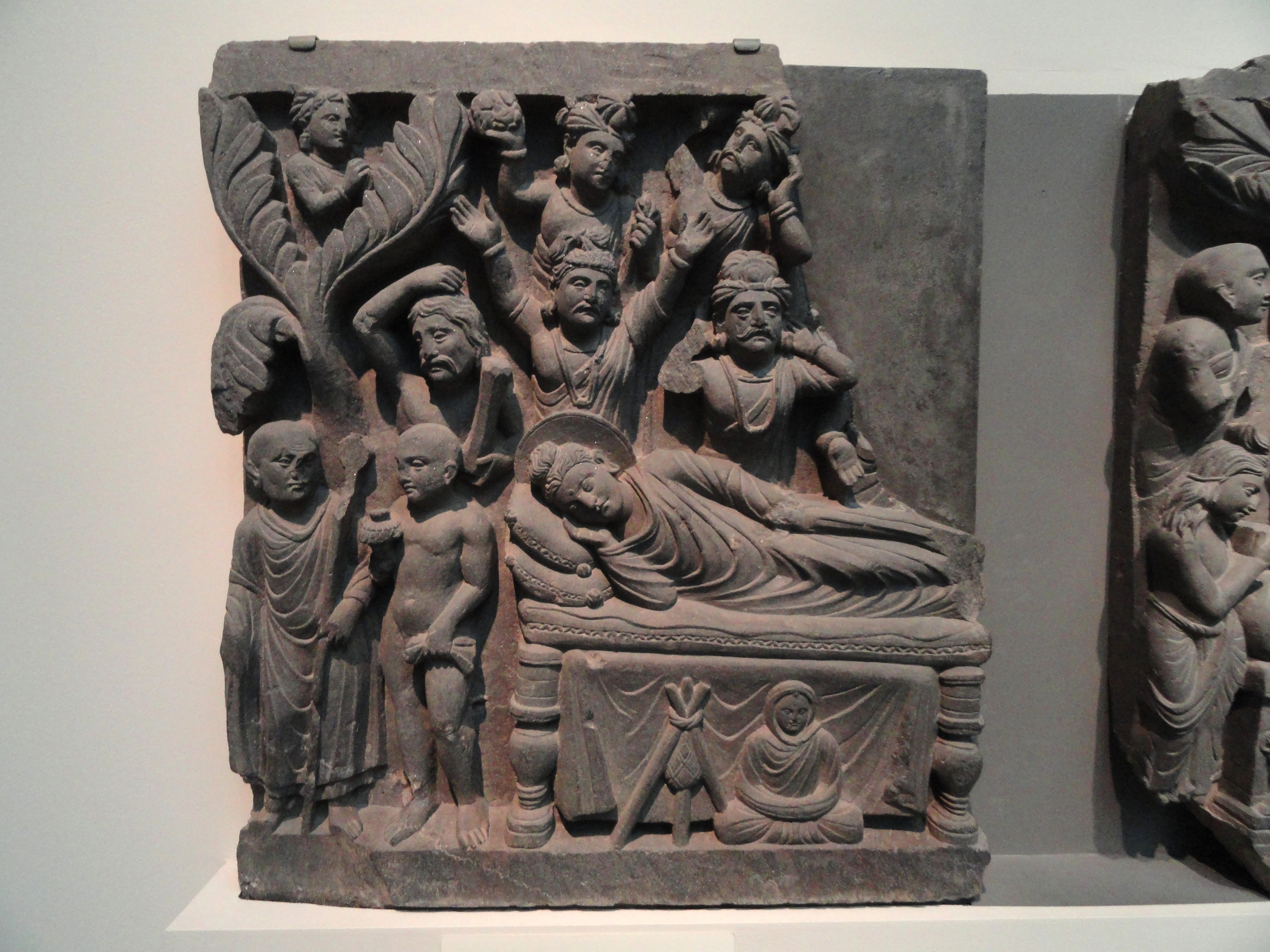
On the left: Mahākāśyapa meets an Ājīvika and learns of the parinirvana.

Ajivika (Sanskrit: आजीविक, IAST: Ājīvika) is an ancient nāstika, or 'heterodox', Indian school of absolute fatalism or extreme determinism. The Ājīvika school is known for its Niyati ("Fate") doctrine and for the premise that there is no free will, that everything that has happened, is happening and will happen is entirely preordained and a function of cosmic principles.

Believed to have been founded in the 5th century BCE by Makṣali Gośāla, it was a Śramaṇa movement and a major rival to other contemporary orthodox and heterodox movements within the Indian philosophical milieu. Ājīvikas were organized renunciates who formed discrete communities. The precise identity of the Ājīvikas and their relationships with other movements are not well understood.

Original scriptures of the Ājīvika school of philosophy may once have existed, but these are currently unavailable and probably lost. Their theories are extracted from mentions of Ājīvikas in the secondary sources of ancient Indian literature. The oldest descriptions of the Ājīvika fatalists and their founder Gosāla can be found both in the Buddhist and Jaina scriptures of ancient India. Scholars question whether Ājīvika philosophy has been fairly and completely summarized in these secondary sources, as they were written by groups (such as the Buddhists and Jains) competing with and adversarial to the philosophy and religious practices of the Ājīvikas. It is likely that much of the information available about the Ājīvikas is inaccurate to some degree, and characterizations of them should be regarded carefully and critically.

The predetermined fate of living beings was the major distinctive doctrine of their school, along with withholding judgement on how to achieve liberation (moksha) from the eternal cycle of birth, death, and rebirth, instead believing that fate would lead us there. Ājīvikas further considered the karma doctrine as a fallacy. They were mostly considered as atheists; however, they believed that in every living being there is an ātman—a central premise of the Vedas.

The metaphysics of Ājīvika included a theory of atoms, where everything was composed of atoms, qualities emerged from aggregates of atoms, but the aggregation and nature of these atoms were predetermined by cosmic laws and forces. It was not until the later Avisakya Sūtra that the Jains, whose atomic theory was closest to that of the Ājīvikas, began claiming to have been the first to formulate an Indian theory of atomism. A similar type of atomistic theory is also found in the Vaiśeṣika school. However, according to Basham, the Vaiśeṣika doctrine of atomism was significantly different, and more complete and thorough than that of both the Ājīvikas and the Jains.

Ājīvika philosophy, otherwise referred to as Ājīvikism in Western scholarship, reached the height of its popularity during the rule of the Mauryan emperor Bindusara, around the 4th century BCE. This school of thought declined but survived for nearly 2,000 years through the 13th and 14th centuries CE in what are now the Southern Indian states of Karnataka and Tamil Nadu. The Ājīvika philosophy, along with the Cārvāka philosophy, appealed most to the warrior, industrial, and mercantile classes of ancient Indian society.

== Etymology and meaning ==
Ājīvika means "Follower of the Way of Life". Ajivika (Prakrit: 𑀆𑀚𑀻𑀯𑀺𑀓, ājīvika; Sanskrit: आजीविक, IAST: ājīvika) or adivika (Prakrit: 𑀆𑀤𑀻𑀯𑀺𑀓, ādīvika) are both derived from Sanskrit आजीव (ājīva) which literally means "livelihood, lifelong, mode of life". The term Ajivika means "those following special rules with regard to Iivelihood", sometimes connoting "religious mendicants" in ancient Sanskrit and Pali texts.

The name Ajivika for an entire philosophy resonates with its core belief in "no free will" and complete niyati, literally "inner order of things, self-command, predeterminism", leading to the premise that good simple living is not a means to salvation or moksha, just a means to true livelihood, predetermined profession and way of life. The name came to imply that the school of Indian philosophy which lived a good simple mendicant-like livelihood for its own sake and as part of its predeterministic beliefs, rather than for the sake of after-life or motivated by any soteriological reasons.

Some scholars spell Ajivika as Ajivaka.

== History ==
=== Origins ===
Views of the six heretical teachers
- The views of six śramaṇa in the Pāli Canon, known as the six heretical teachers, based on the Sāmaññaphala Sutta.

Pūraṇa Kassapa
- Amoralism (akiriyavāda; natthikavāda): There is no reward or punishment for either good or bad deeds.

Makkhali Gośāla (Ājīvika)
- Fatalism (ahetukavāda; niyativāda): We are powerless; suffering is pre-destined.

Ajita Kesakambalī (Charvaka)
- Materialism (ucchedavāda; natthikavāda): Live happily; with death, all is annihilated.

Pakudha Kaccāyana
- Eternalism and categoricalism (sassatavāda; sattakāyavāda): Matter, pleasure, pain and the soul are eternal and do not interact.

Nigaṇṭha Ñāṭaputta (Jainism)
- Restraint (mahāvrata): Be endowed with, cleansed by, and suffused with [merely] the avoidance of all evil.

Sañjaya Belaṭṭhiputta (Ajñana)
- Agnosticism (amarāvikkhepavāda): "I don't think so. I don't think in that way or otherwise. I don't think not or not not." Suspension of judgement.

Ājīvika philosophy is cited in ancient texts of Buddhism and Jainism to Makkhali Gosala, a contemporary of the Buddha and Mahavira. In Sandaka Sutta the Ājīvikas are said to recognize three emancipators: Nanda Vaccha, Kisa Saṅkicca, and Makkhali Gosāla. Exact origins of Ājīvika is unknown, but generally accepted to be the 5th century BCE.

Primary sources and literature of the Ājīvikas are lost, or yet to be found. Everything that is known about Ājīvika history and its philosophy is from secondary sources, such as the ancient and medieval texts of India. Inconsistent fragments of Ājīvika history are found mostly in Jain texts such as the Bhagvati Sutra and Buddhist texts such as the Samaññaphala Sutta and Sandaka Sutta, and Buddhaghosa's commentary on Sammannaphala Sutta, with a few mentions in Hindu texts such as Vayu Purana.

The Ājīvikas reached the height of their prominence in the late 1st millennium BCE, then declined, yet continued to exist in south India until the 14th century CE, as evidenced by inscriptions found in southern India. Ancient texts of Buddhism and Jainism mention a city in the 1st millennium BCE named Savatthi (Sanskrit Śravasti) as the hub of the Ājīvikas; it was located near Ayodhya in what is now the North Indian state of Uttar Pradesh. In later part of the common era, inscriptions suggests that the Ājīvikas had a significant presence in the South Indian state of Karnataka, prominently in Kolar district and some places of Tamil Nadu.

The Ājīvika philosophy spread rapidly in ancient South Asia, with a Sangha Geham (community center) for Ājīvikas on the island now known as Sri Lanka and also extending into the western state of Gujarat by the 4th century BCE, the era of the Maurya Empire.

==== Classification in Hindu philosophy ====
Riepe refers to Ājīvikas as a distinct heterodox school of Indian tradition. Raju states that "Ājīvikas and Cārvākas can be called Hindus" and adds that "the word Hinduism has no definite meaning". Epigraphical evidence suggests that emperor Ashoka, in the 3rd century BCE, considered Ājīvikas to be more closely related to the schools of Vedics than to Buddhists, Jainas or other Indian schools of thought.

Edicts of Ashoka dedicating the Barabar Caves to Ajivikas
Inscription (transliterated)	English translation
1. Läjinä Piyadasina duväḍasa-vasäbhisitenä 2. iyam nigoha kubhā dinä Äjivikehi.	This Banyan-cave was given to the Ajivikas by King Priyadasin, crowned twelve years. (Date: c. 257 BCE)
1. Lajinä Piyadasina duvä-; 2. ḍasa vasäbhisitenä iyam 3. kubhā Khalatika-pavatasi; 4. dină Äjivikehi.	This cave in the Khalatika hill was given to the Ajivikas by King Priyadasin, crowned twelve years. (Date: c. 257 BCE)
1. Laja Piyadasina ekunavi-; 2. sati-vasäbhisite jala-gho-; 3. sägamathata me iyam khubha 4. supiye Khalatika-pavatasi; 5. na Äjivikehi.	When King Priyadasin was crowned nineteenth years, this cave in the very pleasant Khalatika hill was given by me to the Ajivikas, for the sake of (shelter from) the approach of the roar of waters. (Date: c. 250 BCE)

=== Biography of Makkhali Gosala ===
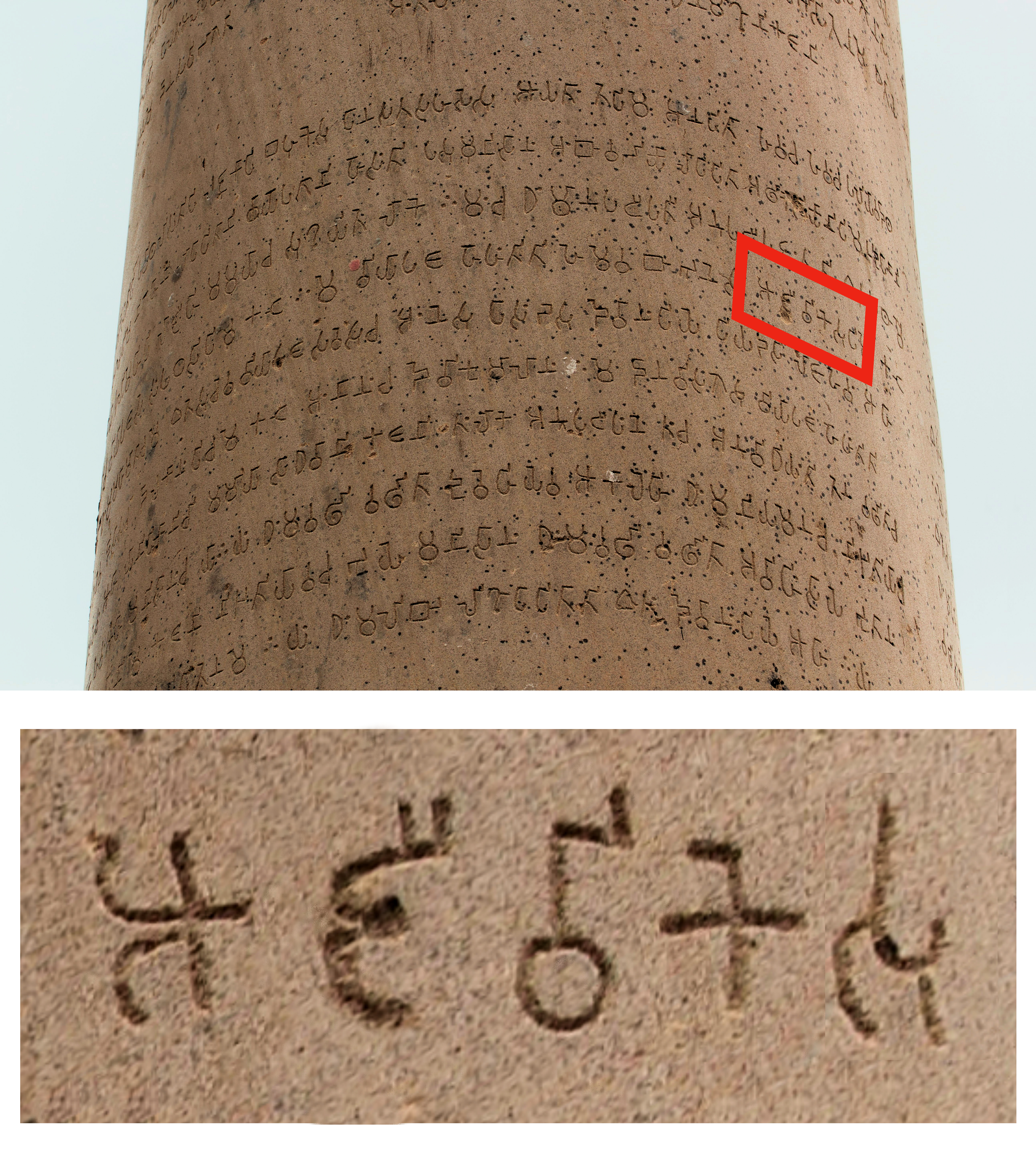
Ashoka's Seventh Pillar Edict mentions Ajivikas: "Some Mahamatras were ordered by me to busy themselves with the affairs of the Samgha. Likewise others were ordered by me to busy themselves also with the Brahmanas (and) Ajivikas" (Line 25). Photograph of the portion of the 7th Edict, in the Brahmi script on the Ashoka pillar of Feroz Shah Kotla, New Delhi (3rd century BCE), with "Ājīvikesu" (𑀆𑀚𑀻𑀯𑀺𑀓𑁂𑀲𑀼) inscription.

Makkhali Gosala (Pali; Sanskrit Gośala Maskariputra, c. 484 BCE) is generally considered as the founder of the Ājīvika movement. Some sources state that Gosala was only a leader of a large Ājīvika congregation of ascetics, but not the founder of the movement himself. The Swedish Indologist Jarl Charpentier and others suggest the Ājīvika tradition existed in India well before the birth of Makkhali Gosala, citing a variety of ancient Indian texts.

With regards to Gosala's early years, it is related in the Bhagavati that he was born in the settlement Saravana, in the vicinity apparently of the city of Savatthi.(Shravasti, Uttar Pradesh) and was the son of Mankha, a professional mendicant. His mother was Bhaddā. His name Gosala "cowshed" refers to his humble birthplace.

While Bhaddā was pregnant, she and her husband Mankhali, the mankha, came to the village ... of Saravaṇa, where dwelt a wealthy householder Gobahula. Mankhali left his wife and his luggage ... in Gobahula's cowshed (gosālā) ... Since he could find no shelter elsewhere the couple continued to live in a corner of the cowshed, and it was there that Bhaddā gave birth to her child."

Gosala is described in ancient texts as a contemporary of Mahavira, the 24th Tirthankara of Jainism, and of Gautama Buddha. The Jain Bhagavati Sutra refers to him as Gosala Mankhaliputta ("son of Mankhali"). The text depicts Gosala as having been a disciple of Mahavira's for a period of six years, after which the two had a falling out and parted ways. According to the Bhagvati Sutra, Makkhali Gosala met with Mahāvīra again later in life, but Gosala asserted to Mahavira that he was not the same person. Makkhali Gosala referred to the example of a sesame plant which "had been pulled up, and had temporarily died, but it had been replanted and thus reanimated, becoming once more living, while the seven pods had developed". Gosāla declared that the original Gosāla, who was Mahavira's companion, was once dead and that the soul now inhabiting the apparent Gosāla in front of him was a reanimated, different Gosala. This argument was declared a form of sophistry by Mahavira, and this led to a significant break in the relations between the two. The disputes arose in the between the two and thus they got separated. Gośāla was not the only follower of Mahāvīra who turned away from him also he started his new religion on the principle of absolute determinism and that's how the ajivika came into existence.

=== Inscriptions and caves ===
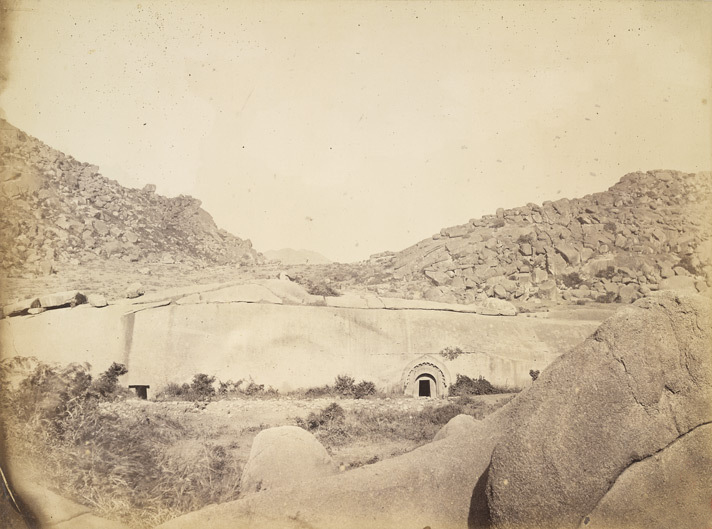
The 3rd century BCE mendicant caves of the Ājīvikas (Barabar, near Gaya, Bihar)

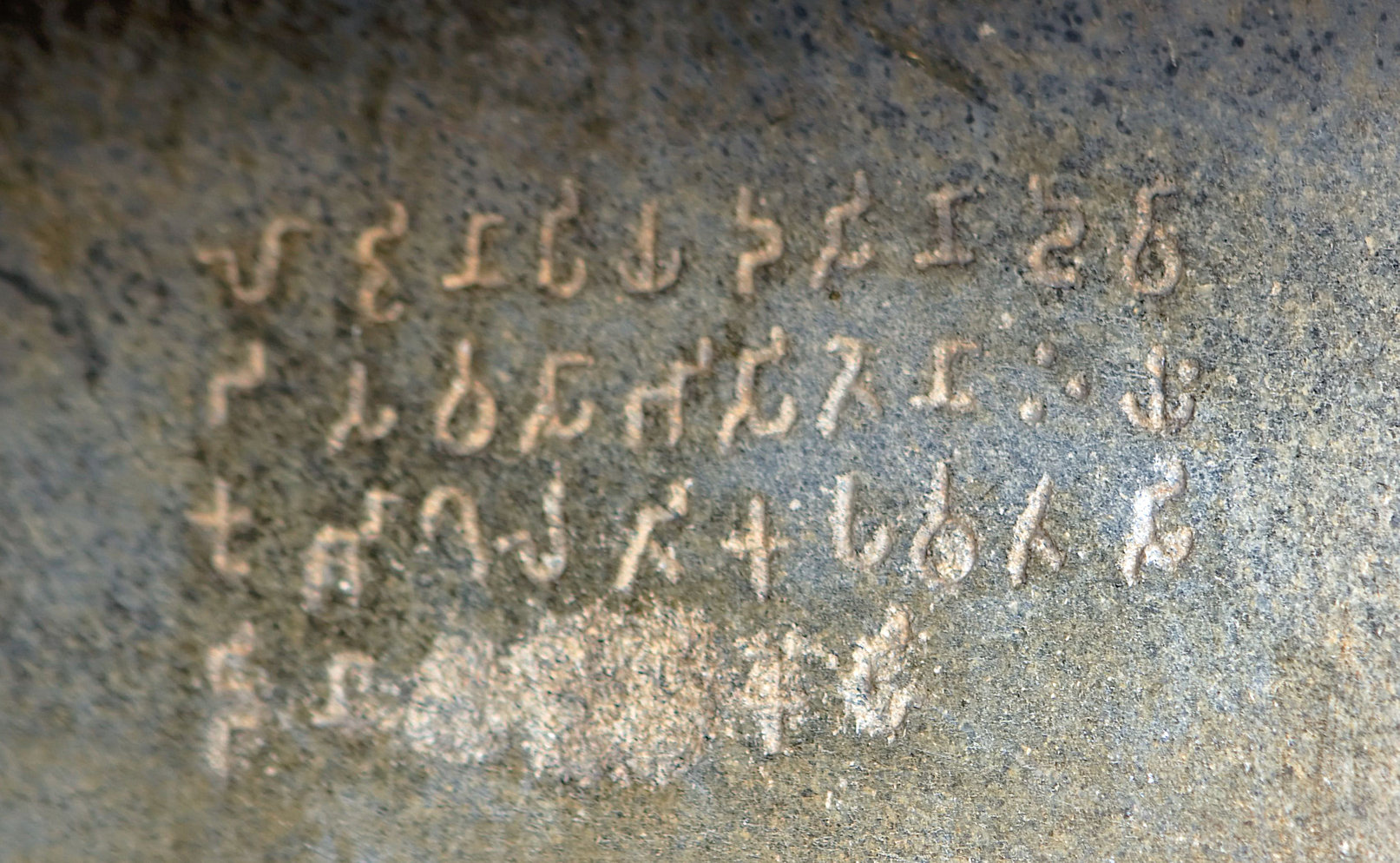
Dedicatory inscription of Ashoka in Visvakarma/Viswamitra cave, Barabar. The word "Ājīvikas" (𑀆𑀤𑀻𑀯𑀺𑀓𑁂𑀳𑀺, Ādīvikehi) was later attacked with the burin, at a time when the Brahmi script was still understood, i.e. before the 5th century, but remains decipherable.

Several rock-cut caves belonging to Ājīvikas are dated to the times of the Mauryan emperor Ashoka (r. 273 BCE to 232 BCE). These are the oldest surviving cave temples of ancient India, and are called the Barabar Caves in Jehanabad district of Bihar. The Barabar caves were carved out of granite, has a highly polished internal cave surfaces, and each consists of two chambers, the first is a large rectangular hall, the second is a small, circular, domed chamber. These were probably used for meditation.

The Ashokan dedications of several Barabar Caves to the Ajivikas were engraved during the 12th year and the 19th year of his reign (about 258 BCE and 251 BCE respectively, based on a coronation date of 269 BCE). In several instances, the word "Ājīvikas" (𑀆𑀤𑀻𑀯𑀺𑀓𑁂𑀳𑀺, Ādīvikehi) was later attacked by the chisel, probably by religious rivals, at a time when the Brahmi script was still understood (probably before the 5th century CE). However, the original inscriptions being deep, they remain easily decipherable.

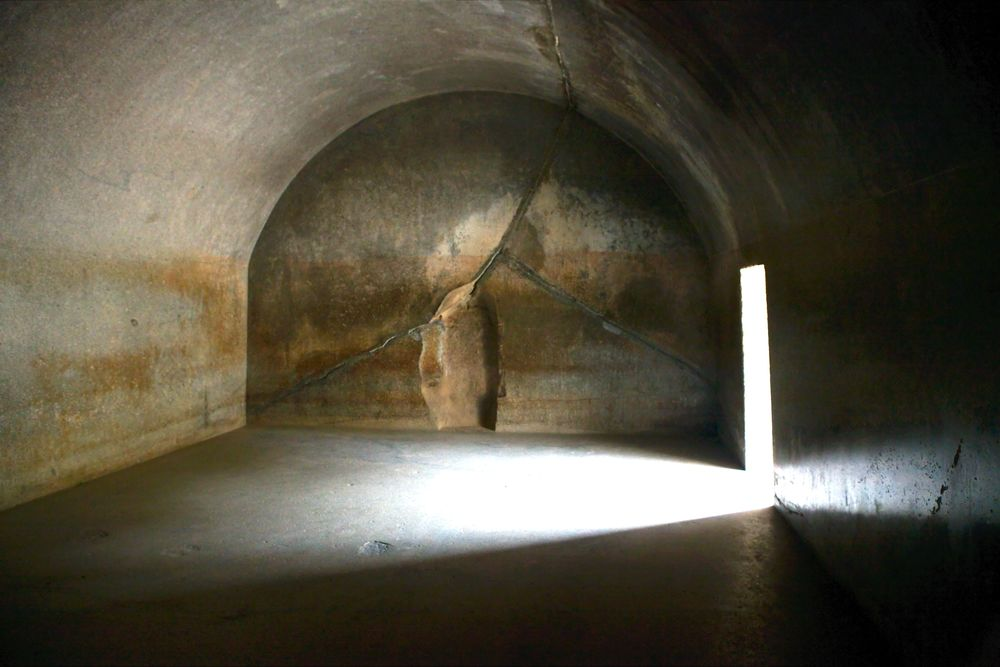
Cave of Sudama, dedicated to the Ajivikas by Ashoka. Barabar Caves, 3rd century BCE.

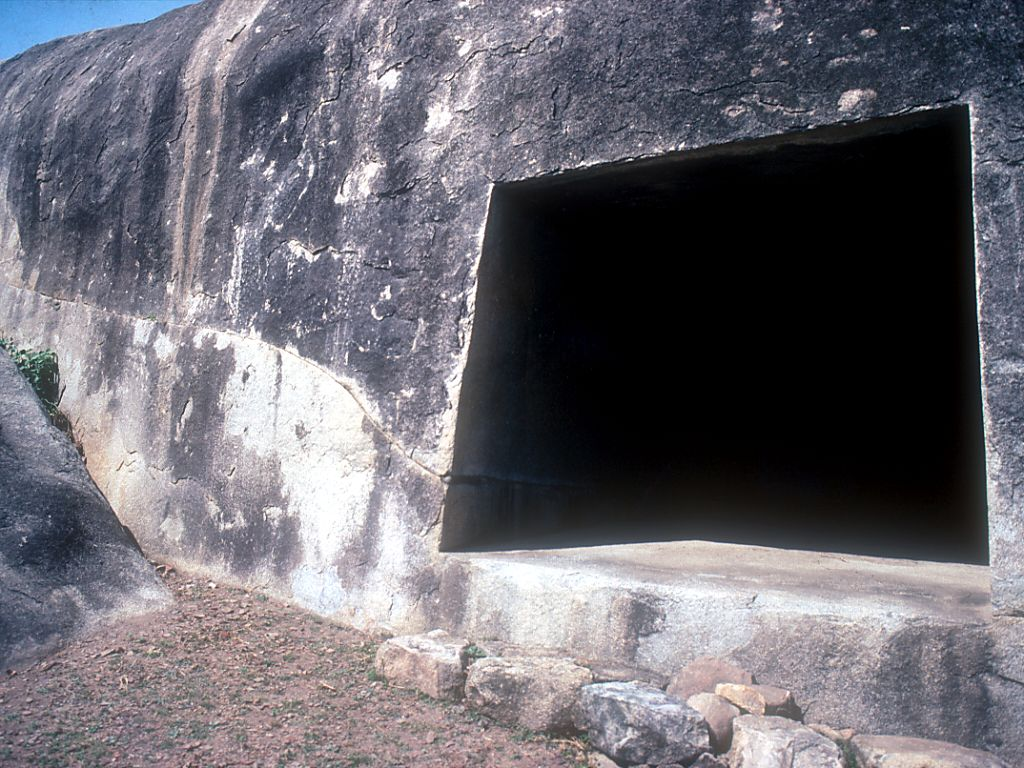
Cave of Visvakarma, dedicated to the Ajivikas by Ashoka. Barabar Caves, 3rd century BCE.

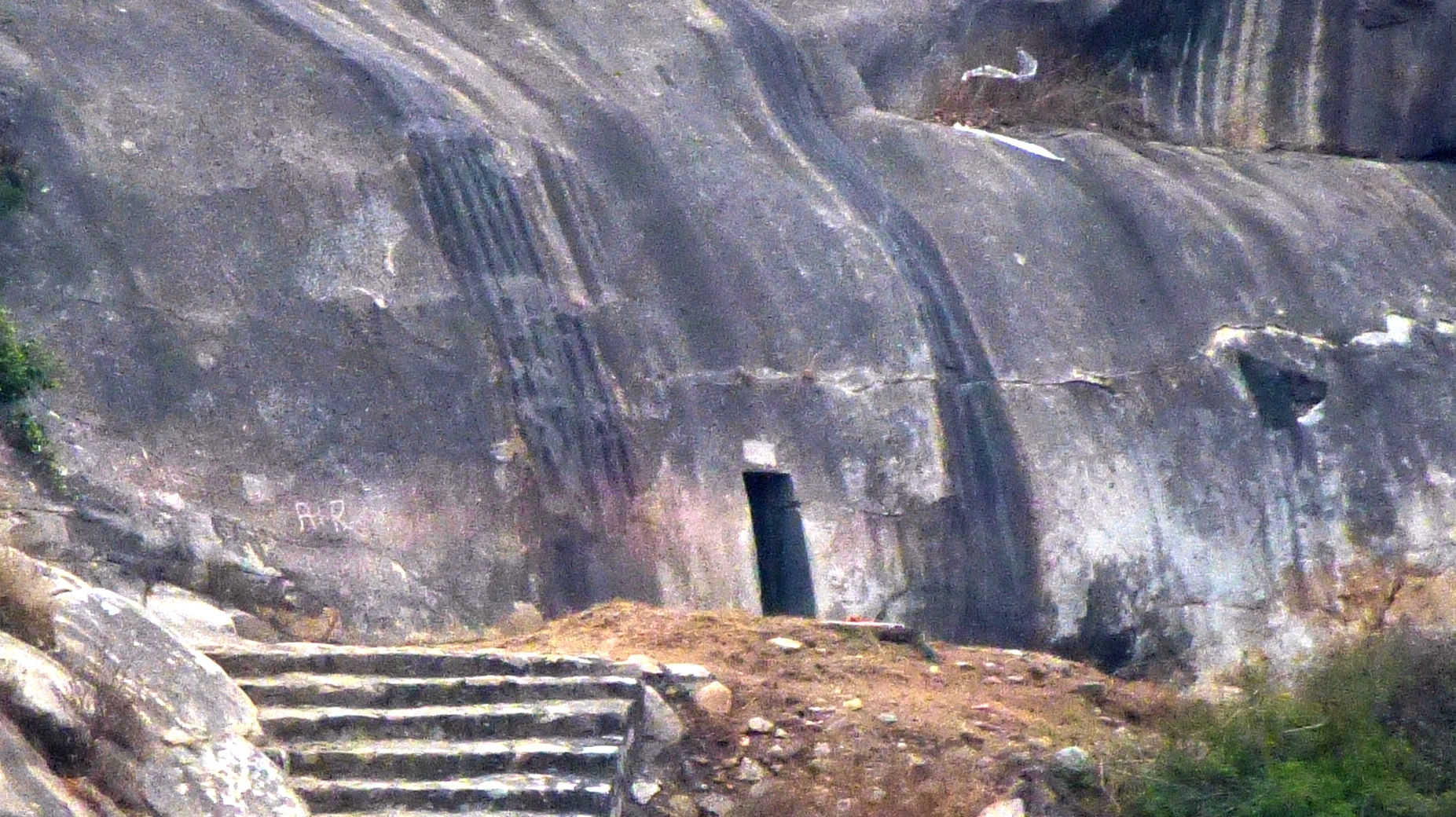
Cave of Gopita, dedicated to the Ajivikas by Dasharatha Maurya. Barabar Caves, 3rd century BCE.

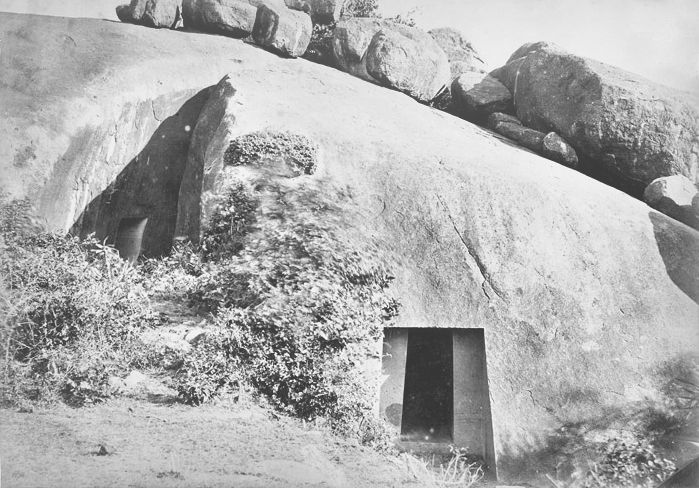
Caves of Vadathika and Vapiyaka, dedicated to the Ajivikas by Dasharatha Maurya. Barabar Caves, 3rd century BCE.

=== Decline ===
After the decline of the Maurya Empire in the 2nd century BCE, the Ajivikas find only occasional mentions in the Sanskrit literature and do not appear to have been serious rivals to other sects. The final versions of the Buddhist and Jain scriptures were compiled at a later period, but the description of Ajivikas in these texts likely represents the conditions of the Maurya and pre-Maurya times.

In northern India, Ajivikas may have become insignificant by the Shunga period (1st century BCE), although they may have survived until the 15th century, as suggested by stray references to them in various texts. References in the Vayu Purana suggest that during the Gupta period (fourth-6th century CE) the Ajivika practices had changed substantially, and their sect was declining rapidly.

In some of the Barabar Caves inscriptions, the words referring to the Ajivikas appear to have been defaced, although the rest of the text appears intact. The selective nature of these defacements suggests that they were carried out by the religious rivals of the Ajivikas. This defacement must have taken place when the Brahmi script had still not been forgotten, likely some time before the 5th century CE. The Caves were subsequently occupied by Buddhists, Hindus and Muslims. It is unlikely that the Muslims defaced the inscriptions, as the Brahmi script was illegible to them. E. Hultzsch theorized that the defacement took place when the Maukhari (c. 6th century) ruler Ananta-varman installed Hindu images at the Caves. However, Basham dismisses this theory, noting that there is little evidence to support this view and the only cave in which the word Ajivikehi remains intact is among the three caves where Ananta-varman installed a Hindu image. Based on similarities of carvings at the Barabar and the Udaygiri Caves, scholar A. Banerji Sastri theorized that the Kalinga monarch Kharavela (1st-2nd century BCE) evicted the Ajivikas to favour Jains, but Basham finds this evidence inconclusive. According to Basham, any ruler of Magadha between the Maurya and the Gupta periods may have been responsible for the persecution of the Ajivikas.

The Brhaj-jataka of Varahamihira (6th century) mentions the Ajivikas (among other major ascetic groups) in an astrological context, stating that a person born under a certain planetary influence becomes an Ajivika ascetic. According to the 9th-10th century commentator Utpala, "Ajivika" in this context refers to the Vaishnavite Ekadandin ascetics. However, according to historian Ajay Mitra Shastri, Varahamihira indeed refers to the Ajivikas, who may have existed as an influential sect in the 6th century. A.L. Basham notes that there are several such instances of Ajivikas being confused with other major sects: for example, the commentator of Achara-sara believes them to be Buddhist, and in Neelakesi, the Ajivika leader clarifies that his followers should not be mistaken for Digambaras. According to Basham, this suggests that the surviving Ajivikas adopted some of the beliefs and customs of the more popular faiths and possibly merged with them.

The Jain commentator Mallisena, who wrote Syadvada-manjari (1292 CE), suggests that the Ajivikas existed during his time; he may have been aware of the Ajivikas of southern India. At least 17 inscriptions from southern India suggest that a tax was imposed on Ajivikas or Acuvas (believed to be a Tamil form of Ajivikas) there. These inscriptions range from the time of the Pallava king Simhavarman II (c. 446 CE) to the 14th century. The last of these inscriptions are dated to 1346 CE (Shaka 1268), found at three different places around Kolar. E. Hultzsch and Rudolf Hoernlé theorized that the term Ajivika (Acuva) refers to Jains in this context, and some others—such as A. Chakravarti—doubt the equivalence of the terms "Ajivika" and "Acuva". However, Basham believes that these inscriptions indeed refer to the Ajivikas and that they may have survived there until the 15th century, as suggested by the writings of Vaidyanatha Dikshita. The Ajivikas may have completely declined because of the growing Hindu, Buddhist and Jain influence.

The 14th century Sarva-Darshana-Sangraha, a compendium of the Indian philosophical systems, makes no mention of Ajivikas, which indicates the decline of their sect.

== Reliability of sources ==
Ājīvikas competed with and debated the scholars of Buddhism, Jainism, and Vedics. The Ājīvika movement is primarily known from historical references left behind in Jain and Buddhist sources, that may therefore be hostile to it. It is unknown to what degree the available non-Ājīvika sources reflect the actual beliefs and practices of the Ājīvikas. Most of what is known about them was recorded in the literature of rival groups, modern scholars question the reliability of the secondary sources, and whether intentional distortions for dehumanization and criticism were introduced into the records.

More recent work by scholars suggests that the Ājīvika were perhaps misrepresented by Jain and Buddhist sources.

[Johannes Bronkhorst's] claim is that, whereas the Jains teach that one can both stop the influx of new karma and rid oneself of old karma through ascetic practice, Gosāla taught that one could only stop the influx of new karma. [...] Ascetic practice can be effective in preventing further karmic influx, which helps to explain the otherwise inexplicable fact that the Ājīvikas did practice asceticism. [...] [T]he popularity of the Ājīvika doctrine in ancient times, such that it could rival that of both Jainism and Buddhism, also make sense if this doctrine was really not so radically different from these traditions as its presentation in Jain and Buddhist sources suggests.

Paul Dundas states that the Jain and Buddhist texts cannot be considered reliable source of Ājīvika history and philosophy, because "it seems doubtful whether a doctrine [of Ajivikas] which genuinely advocated the lack of efficacy of individual effort could have formed the basis of a renunciatory path to spiritual liberation", and that "the suspicion must be that the Jains and Buddhists deliberately distorted Ajivika doctrine for their own polemical purposes". In contrast, other scholars suggest that at least the common elements found about Ājīvikas in Jain and Buddhist literature may be considered, because Jainism and Buddhism were two different, competing and conflicting philosophies in ancient India.

== Philosophy ==
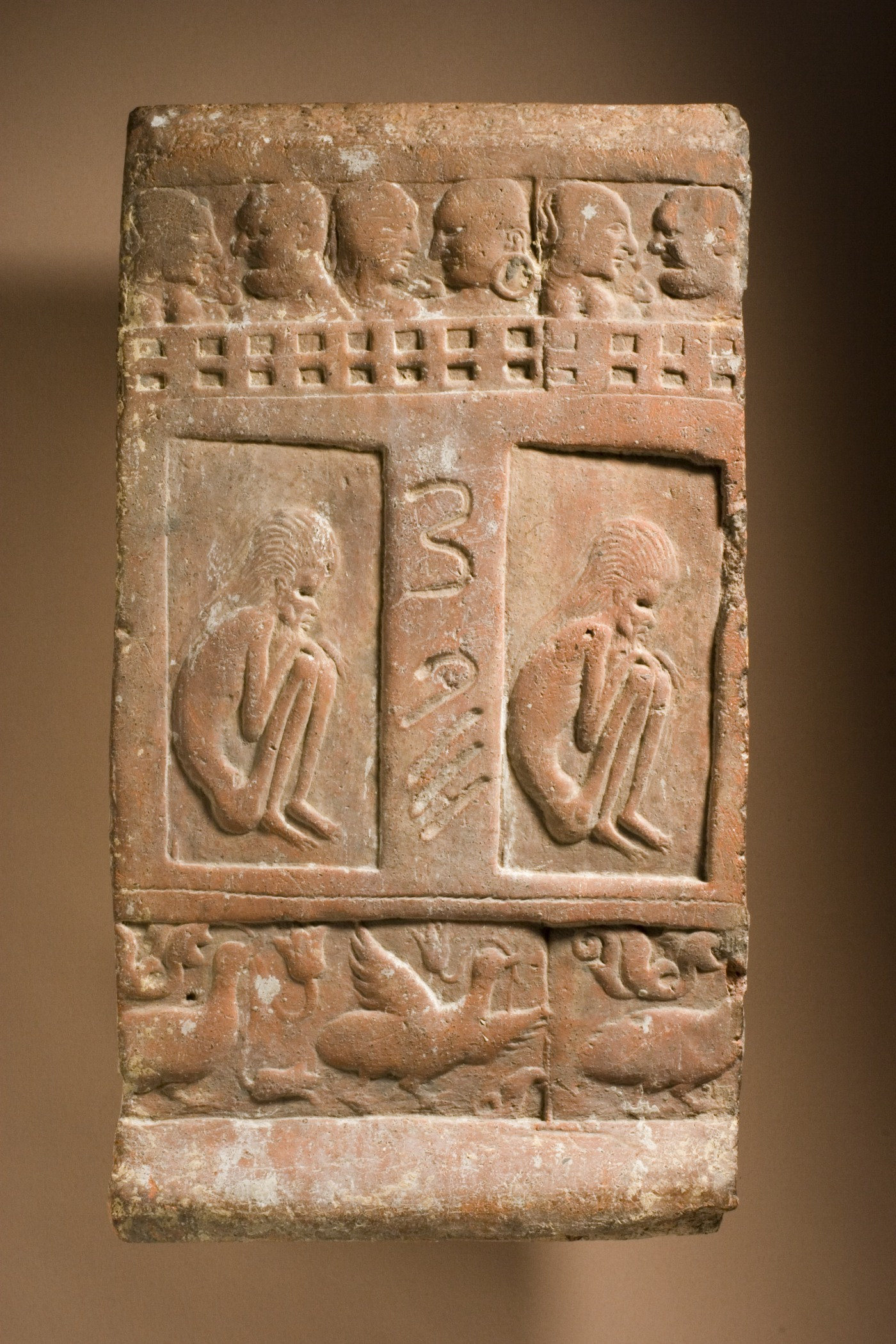
Tile possibly representing Ajivika ascetics

=== Absolute determinism and no free will ===
The problems of time and change were one of the main interests of the Ajivikas. Their views on this subject may have been influenced by Vedic sources, such as the hymn to Kala (Time) in Atharvaveda. Both Jaina and Buddhist texts state that Ājīvikas believed in absolute determinism, absence of free will, and called this niyati. Everything in human life and the universe, according to Ajivikas, was pre-determined, operating out of cosmic principles, and true choice did not exist. The Buddhist and Jaina sources describe them as strict fatalists, who did not believe in karma. The Ajivikas philosophy held that all things are preordained, and therefore religious or ethical practice has no effect on one's future, and people do things because cosmic principles make them do so, and all that will happen or will exist in future is already predetermined to be that way. No human effort could change this niyati, and the karma ethical theory was a fallacy. James Lochtefeld summarizes this aspect of Ajivika belief as, "life and the universe is like a ball of pre-wrapped up string, which unrolls until it [is] done and then goes no further".

Riepe states that the Ajivika belief in predeterminism does not mean they were pessimistic. Instead, like Calvinists' belief in predeterminism in Europe, the Ajivikas were optimists. The Ajivikas did not believe in the moral force of action, merits or demerits, or in the after-life to be affected by what one does or does not do. Actions had immediate effects in one's current life but without any moral traces, and both the action and the effect were predetermined, according to the Ajivikas.

Makkhali Gosala seems to have combined the ideas of older schools of thought into an eclectic doctrine. He appears to have believed in niyati (destiny), svabhava (nature), sangati (change), and possibly parinama, which may have prompted other philosophical schools to label him variously as ahetuvadin, vainayikavadin, ajnanavadin, and issarakaranavadin. According to him, all beings undergo development (parinama). This culminates over time (samsarasuddhi) in final salvation to which all beings are destined under the impact of the factors of niyati (destiny), bhava (nature), and sangati (change). As such, destiny does not appear as the only player, but rather chance or indeterminism plays an equal part in his doctrine. He thus subscribed to niyativada (fatalism) only because he thought that some future events, like salvation for all, were strictly determined.

=== Ajivikas and theism ===
Ajivika was an atheistic philosophy. Its adherents did not presume any deity as the creator of the universe, or as prime mover, or that some unseen mystical end was the final resting place of the cosmos.

In later texts, the Tamil Nīlakēci, a story of two divinities, Okkali and Ōkali, relates that the Ājīvikas instructed men in the scriptures.

Ajivikas believed that every being has a soul (Atman). However, unlike Jains and various orthodox schools of Hinduism that held that the soul is formless, Ajivikas asserted that the soul has a material form that helps meditation. They also believed the soul passes through many births and ultimately progresses unto its pre-destined nirvana (salvation). Basham states that some texts suggest evidence of Vaishnavism-type devotional practices among some Ajivikas.

=== Atomism ===
Ajivikas developed a theory of elements and atoms similar to the Vaisheshika school of Vedics. Everything was composed of minuscule atoms, according to Ajivikas, and qualities of things are derived from aggregates of atoms, but cosmic forces predetermined the aggregation and nature of these atoms.

The description of Ajivikas' atomism is inconsistent with that described in Buddhist and Vedic texts. According to three Tamil texts, the Ajivikas held there exists seven kayas (Sanskrit: काय, assemblage, collection, elemental categories): pruthvi-kaya (earth), apo-kaya (water), tejo-kaya (fire), vayo-kaya (air), sukha (joy), dukkha (sorrow), and jiva (life). The first four relate to matter, the last three to non-matter. These elements are akata (neither created nor destroyed), vanjha (barren, that which never multiplies or reproduces), and have an existence independent of the other. The elements, asserts Ajivika theory in the Tamil text Manimekalai, are made of paramanu (atoms), where atoms were defined as that which cannot be further subdivided, that which cannot penetrate another atom, that which is neither created nor destroyed, that which retains its identity by never growing nor expanding nor splitting nor changing, yet that which moves, assembles and combines to form the perceived.

The Tamil text of Ajivikas asserts this "coming together of atoms can take diversity of forms, such as the dense form of a diamond, or a loose form of a hollow bamboo". According to the atomism theory of Ajivikas, everything one perceives was mere juxtapositions of atoms of various types, and the combinations occur always in fixed ratios governed by certain cosmic rules, forming skandha (molecules, building blocks). Atoms, asserted the Ajivikas, cannot be seen by themselves in their pure state, but only when they aggregate and form bhutas (objects). They further argued that properties and tendencies are characteristics of the objects. The Ajivikas then proceeded to justify their belief in determinism and "no free will" by stating that everything experienced—sukha (joy), dukkha (sorrow), and jiva (life)—is a mere function of atoms operating under cosmic rules.

Riepe states that the details of the Ajivikas' theory of atomism provided the foundations of later modified atomism theories found in Jain, Buddhist, and Vedic traditions.

=== Antinomian ethics ===
Another doctrine of Ajivikas philosophy, according to Buddhist texts, was their antinomian ethics, that is there exist "no objective moral laws". Buddhaghosa summarizes this view as, "There is neither cause nor basis for the sins of living beings and they become sinful without cause or basis. There is neither cause nor basis for the purity of living beings and they become pure without cause or basis. All beings, all that have breath, all that are born, all that have life, are without power, or strength, or virtue, but are the result of destiny, chance and nature, and they experience joy and sorrow in six classes".

Despite this ascribed premise of antinomian ethics, both Jain and Buddhist records note that Ājīvikas lived a simple ascetic life, without clothes and material possessions.

Tamil literature on Ajivikas suggests they practiced Ahimsa (non-violence) and a vegetarian lifestyle. Arthur Basham notes that Buddhist and Jaina texts variously accuse Ajivikas of immorality, unchastity, and worldliness, but they also acknowledge the confusion among Buddhists and Jainas when they observed the simple, ascetic lifestyle of Ajivikas.

== Scriptures ==
The Ajivikas had a fully elaborate philosophy, produced by their scholars and logicians, but those texts are lost. Their literature evolved over the centuries, like other traditions of Indian philosophy, through the medieval era. The Pali and Prakrit texts of Buddhism and Jainism suggest that Ajivika theories were codified, some of which were quoted in commentaries produced by Buddhist and Jaina scholars.

The primary texts of the Ajivikas included the ten Purvas (eight Mahanimittas, two Maggas) and the Onpatu Katir. The Mahanimittas of Ajivikas claims Bhagavati Sutra was extracted from the teachings Gosala received from Mahavira when he was a disciple.

The belief of Ajivikas in absolute determinism and the influence of cosmic forces led them to develop extensive sections in their Mahanimittas texts on mapping the sun, moon, planets, and stars and their role in astrology and fortune telling.

== Influence ==
Isaeva suggests that the ideas of Ajivika influenced Buddhism and various schools of Vedic thought. Riepe provides an example of an influential Ajivika theory, namely, its theory on atomism. Basham proposes that Ajivikas may have possibly influenced the doctrines of the Dvaita Vedanta sub-school of medieval Vedic philosophy.

== Conflict between Ajivikas, Buddhists and Jains ==
According to the 4th century Buddhist legend Ashokavadana, the Mauryan emperor Bindusara and his chief queen Shubhadrangi were believers of this philosophy, which reached its peak of popularity during this time. Ashokavadana also mentions that, after his conversion to Buddhism, Bindusara's son Ashoka issued an order to kill all the Ajivikas in Pundravardhana, enraged at a picture that depicted Gautama Buddha in a negative light. Around 18,000 followers of the Ajivika sect were supposedly executed as a result of this order. The entire story may be apocryphal.

According to K. T. S. Sarao and Benimadhab Barua, stories of persecutions of Ajivikas by Ashoka appear to be a clear fabrication arising out of sectarian propaganda. Ashoka's own inscriptions Barabar Caves record his generous donations and patronage to Ajivikas.

An earlier Jaina text, the Bhagavati Sutra, similarly mentions a debate, disagreement, and then "coming to blows" between factions led by Mahavira and by Gosala.

== See also ==
- Ajñana
- Āstika and nāstika
- Atomism
- Stoicism
- Atheism
- Cārvāka
- Determinism
- Gymnosophists
