= Determinism (disambiguation) =

Determinism is the philosophical position that events are entirely determined by pre-existing causes.

Determinism has many meanings in different fields:

== Philosophy ==
- Determinism
- Deterministic system (philosophy)
- Economic determinism in philosophy of history
- Historical determinism
- Linguistic determinism
- Logical determinism
- Retrospective determinism
- Theological determinism

== Psychology ==
- Psychological determinism

== Sociology and anthropology ==
- Cultural determinism
- Environmental determinism
- Social determinism
- Technological determinism
- Nominative determinism

== Environmental geography ==
- Climatic determinism

== Biology ==
- Biological determinism
- Genetic determinism
- Determinism theory of hematopoiesis

== Physics ==
- Superdeterminism

== Mathematics ==
- Deterministic system
- Determinacy in set theory and game theory

== Computer science ==
- Deterministic algorithm
- Deterministic automaton
- Deterministic finite automaton

== Entertainment and media ==
- Determinism (film), a 2011 American crime drama film

== See also ==
- Determination
- Indeterminacy (disambiguation)
- Determiner in linguistics
- Determinable (disambiguation)
