= Nondeterminism =

Nondeterminism or nondeterministic may refer to:

== Computer science ==
- Nondeterministic programming
- Nondeterministic algorithm
- Nondeterministic model of computation
  - Nondeterministic finite automaton
  - Nondeterministic Turing machine
- Indeterminacy in computation

== Other ==
- Indeterminism (philosophy)

== See also ==
- Indeterminacy (disambiguation)
