= Dickinson S. Miller =

American philosopher (1868–1963)

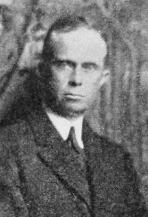
- In the Smith Alumnae Quarterly, November 1924
- Born: Dickinson Sergeant Miller; October 7, 1868; Philadelphia, Pennsylvania, US
- Died: November 13, 1963 (aged 95); Boston, Massachusetts, US
- Burial place: Laurel Hill Cemetery
- Education: University of Pennsylvania; Harvard University
- Occupation: Philosopher

Dickinson Sergeant Miller (October 7, 1868 – November 13, 1963) was an American philosopher best known for his work in metaphysics and the philosophy of mind. He worked with other philosophers including William James, George Santayana, John Dewey, Edmund Husserl, and Ludwig Wittgenstein.

== Biography ==
Dickinson S. Miller was born in Philadelphia on October 7, 1868, a son of law professor Elihu Spencer Miller. He received the A.B. degree in 1889 under George Fullerton at the University of Pennsylvania. He studied psychology under G. Stanley Hall at Clark University for a year, and then went to Harvard where he was a graduate student under William James, G. H. Palmer, Josiah Royce, and Santayana. He received the A.M. from Harvard in 1892.

He then spent a year in Germany studying at Berlin and Halle under Max Dessoir, Hermann Ebbinghaus, and Friedrich Paulsen, earning his Ph.D. with a dissertation on Das Wesen der Erkenntnis und des Irrthums, which was published as "The Meaning of Truth and Error" in The Philosophical Review in 1893.

This article led James to abandon Royce's solution of the knowledge problem in terms of an absolute mind. James recommended Miller to a post at Bryn Mawr College in 1893, where he was a close friend of Woodrow Wilson.

In 1899, Miller became a strong critic of James's famous arguments in The Will to Believe that the beneficial effects of a belief somehow increased its "truth." His critical article was "The Will to Believe and the Duty to Doubt."

Miller left Bryn Mawr that year to become an instructor of philosophy at Harvard, where he had a strong and productive collaboration with James. James referred to Miller as "my most penetrating critic and intimate enemy."

In 1904, Miller left Harvard to be a lecturer in philosophy at Columbia University and professor in 1911. There he worked with Arthur O. Lovejoy and John Dewey.

Miller retired from academic work after two years at Smith College (1926-26) and went into a "European retirement." He visited Rome at first and then alternated between Florence and Vienna, where he made contact with the "Vienna Circle" of philosophers, including Moritz Schlick, Otto Neurath, Rudolf Carnap, Herbert Feigl, and others.

Miller challenged a basic principle of the Circle that "no sentence can be admitted to philosophical thought as having a meaning unless it is verifiable in experience." Such a principle, he argued "cuts the ground from under its own feet" because a sentence has to already have meaning before you can apply the test.

In Vienna he met with Ludwig Wittgenstein who was then loosely associated with the Vienna Circle.

Miller died in Boston on November 13, 1963, and was buried at Laurel Hill Cemetery in Philadelphia.

== Free will as involving determination ==
In 1934, as Miller left to return for America, he published a landmark article in Mind under the pseudonym R. E. Hobart.

He analyzed the relationship between "could" and "can" in the sense of choosing to do otherwise in the same circumstances and he claimed that the controversy of free will versus determinism was a waste of energy over a false antithesis. At least some determinism is not a problem for free will but a feature.

The article was titled "Free Will as Involving Determination and Inconceivable Without It," but it is widely misquoted as "Involving Determinism." His biographer, Loyd Easton, correctly describes it as "an acute example of 'soft determinism' or 'reconciliationism'."

The problem of "determinism" versus free will that William James was concerned about was the strict causal determinism that is better called predeterminism where every event is determined in a causal chain back to the beginning of time, and there is "but one possible future," as James put it.

Far from "reconciling" free will with this kind of determinism, as David Hume said that he had done in his "reconciling project," James proposed the first two-stage model of free will that denies predeterminism and accepts absolute chance as necessary for the generation of alternative possibilities, which are the source of "ambiguous futures" selected by the determination, but not predetermination, of the will.

Miller/Hobart dissents from James's new idea about free will, constructing a distinctive reconciling compatibilism that dispenses with any requirement for chance in the analysis of what persons' abilities to perform alternate acts. Rather than analyzing causality as Hume did, Hobart focuses on moral evaluation of acts and character.

== The Mind article ==
Writing about six years after the discovery of quantum indeterminacy, Hobart explicitly does not endorse strict logical or physical determinism, and he explicitly does endorse the existence of alternative possibilities, i.e., that we can do otherwise in the same circumstances. Hobart does not, however, attribute those possibilities to absolute chance.

He says:

I am not maintaining that determinism is true; only that it is true in so far as we have free will. ... it is not here affirmed that there are no small exceptions, no slight undetermined swervings, no ingredient of absolute chance. All that is here said is that such absence of determination, if and so far as it exists, is no gain to freedom, but sheer loss of it

"We say," I can will this or I can will that, whichever I choose ". Two courses of action present themselves to my mind. I think of their consequences, I look on this picture and on that, one of them commends itself more than the other, and I will an act that brings it about. I knew that I could choose either. That means that I had the power to choose either.

We can contrast Hobart with William James's claim that there are ambiguous futures. The second paragraph is not inconsistent with the two-stage model of free will – first "free" courses of action present themselves, then an adequately determined "will" chooses between them, in a temporal sequence. However, the first paragraph denies that any randomness in the decision process, including the presentation of options, adds to freedom.

Hobart refers to G. E. Moore's idea that one could have done otherwise – "if" one had chosen otherwise. But Hobart views the "if" as redundant, and therefore licenses the claim that we could have done otherwise, full stop.

Thus it is true, after the act of will, that I could have willed otherwise. It is most natural to add, "if I had wanted to"; but the addition is not required. The point is the meaning of "could". I could have willed whichever way I pleased. I had the power to will otherwise, there was nothing to prevent my doing so, and I should have done so if I had wanted.

Hobart finds fault with the indeterminist's position, but he gives the typical overstatement by a determinist critic, that any chance will be the direct cause of our actions, which of course would clearly be a loss of freedom and responsibility

Indeterminism maintains that we need not be impelled to action by our wishes, that our active will need not be determined by them. Motives "incline without necessitating". We choose amongst the ideas of action before us, but need not choose solely according to the attraction of desire, in however wide a sense that word is used. Our inmost self may rise up in its autonomy and moral dignity, independently of motives, and register its sovereign decree.

Now, in so far as this "interposition of the self" is undetermined, the act is not its act, it does not issue from any concrete continuing self; it is born at the moment, of nothing, hence it expresses no quality; it bursts into being from no source. (p.6)

In proportion as an act of volition starts of itself without cause it is exactly, so far as the freedom of the individual is concerned, as if it had been thrown into his mind from without — "suggested" to him — by a freakish demon. It is exactly like it in this respect, that in neither case does the volition arise from what the man is, cares for or feels allegiance to; it does not come out of him. In proportion as it is undetermined, it is just as if his legs should suddenly spring up and carry him off where he did not prefer to go. Far from constituting freedom, that would mean, in the exact measure in which it took place, the loss of freedom.

Possibly Hobart has William James in mind as "the indeterminist." However, the only indeterminist philosopher named in the article is Eddington. James would not have denied that our will is an act of determination, consistent with, and in some sense "caused by" our character and values, our habits, and our current feelings and desires. He simply wanted chance to provide alternative possibilities for actions and a break in the causal chain of strict determinism.

Hobart sees no need for such chance, and no addition to freedom to be had by it. The freedom we take ourselves to have is fully consistent with thorough-going determinism regarding human action.

In daily life we are all determinists, just as we are all libertarians. We are constantly attributing behaviour to the character, the temperament, the peculiarities of the person and expecting him to behave in certain fashions. The very words of our daily converse, as we have so amply observed, are full of determinism. And we see nothing inconsistent in being aware at the same time that he is free in choosing his course, as we know ourselves to be.
