= Nondeterministic programming =

Programming paradigm

A nondeterministic programming language is a language which can specify, at certain points in the program (called "choice points"), various alternatives for program flow. Unlike an if-then statement, the method of choice between these alternatives is not directly specified by the programmer; the program must decide at run time between the alternatives, via some general method applied to all choice points. A programmer specifies a limited number of alternatives, but the program must later choose between them. ("Choose" is, in fact, a typical name for the nondeterministic operator.) A hierarchy of choice points may be formed, with higher-level choices leading to branches that contain lower-level choices within them.

One method of choice is embodied in backtracking systems (such as Amb, or unification in Prolog), in which some alternatives may "fail," causing the program to backtrack and try other alternatives. If all alternatives fail at a particular choice point, then an entire branch fails, and the program will backtrack further, to an older choice point. One complication is that, because any choice is tentative and may be remade, the system must be able to restore old program states by undoing side-effects caused by partially executing a branch that eventually failed.

Another method of choice is reinforcement learning, embodied in systems such as Alisp. In such systems, rather than backtracking, the system keeps track of some measure of success and learns which choices often lead to success, and in which situations (both internal program state and environmental input may affect the choice). These systems are suitable for applications to robotics and other domains in which backtracking would involve attempting to undo actions performed in a dynamic environment, which may be difficult or impractical.

== See also ==
- Nondeterminism (disambiguation)
- Category: Nondeterministic programming languages
- angelic non-determinism
- demonic non-determinism
