= Indeterminate =

Indeterminate may refer to:

== In mathematics ==
- Indeterminate (variable), a symbol that is treated as a variable
- Indeterminate system, a system of simultaneous equations that has more than one solution
- Indeterminate equation, an equation that has more than one solution
- Indeterminate form, an algebraic expression with certain limiting behaviour in mathematical analysis

== Other ==
- Indeterminate growth, a term in biology and especially botany
- Indeterminacy (philosophy), describing the shortcomings of definition in philosophy
- Indeterminacy (music), music for which the composition or performance is determined by chance
- Statically indeterminate, in statics, describing a structure for which the static equilibrium equations are insufficient for determining the internal forces

== See also ==
- Indeterminacy (disambiguation)
