= Strict determinism =

Strict determinism may refer to:

In physics:

- Strict determinism (physics), the assumption that given a known set of initial conditions, future states can be computed

In computing:

- a strict property of deterministic context-free grammars

In philosophy:

- Strict determinism (philosophy), the notion that there is no free will, or human autonomy

== See also ==
- Determinism (disambiguation)
