= Pharmakon =

Concept in philosophy

In critical theory, pharmakon is a concept introduced by Jacques Derrida. It is derived from the Greek source term φάρμακον (phármakon), a word that can mean either remedy or poison. The term is closely related to pharmakos, which means ritual of human sacrifice.

== Derrida ==
In his essay "Plato's Pharmacy", Derrida explores the notion that writing is a pharmakon in a composite sense of these meanings as "a means of producing something". Derrida uses pharmakon to highlight the connection between its traditional meanings and the philosophical notion of indeterminacy. "[T]ranslational or philosophical efforts to favor or purge a particular signification of pharmakon [and to identify it as either "cure" or "poison"] actually do interpretive violence to what would otherwise remain undecidable." Whereas a straightforward view on Plato's treatment of writing (in Phaedrus) suggests that writing is to be rejected as strictly poisonous to the ability to think for oneself in dialogue with others (i.e. to anamnesis), Bernard Stiegler argues that "the hypomnesic appears as that which constitutes the condition of the anamnesic"—in other words, externalised time-bound communication is necessary for original creative thought, in part because it is the primordial support of culture. However, with reference to the fourth "productive" sense of pharmakon, Kakoliris argues (in contrast to the rendition given by Derrida) that the contention between Theuth and the king in Plato's Phaedrus is not about whether the pharmakon of writing is a remedy or a poison, but rather, the less binary question: whether it is productive of memory or remembrance. (Note: "The specific which you have discovered is an aid not to memory, but to reminiscence", in the Jowett translation of Phaedrus on Wikisource; "οὔκουν μνήμης ἀλλὰ ὑπομνήσεως φάρμακον ηὗρες" in the 1903 Greek edition.) Indeterminacy and ambiguity are not, on this view, fundamental features of the pharmakon, but rather, of Derrida's deconstructive reading.

== In pharmacology and therapeutics ==
Relatedly, pharmakon has been theorised in connection with a broader philosophy of technology, biotechnology, immunology, enhancement, and addiction. Gregory Bateson points out that an important part of the Alcoholics Anonymous philosophy is to understand that alcohol plays a curative role for the alcoholic who has not yet begun to dry out. This is not simply a matter of providing an anesthetic, but a means for the alcoholic of "escaping from his own insane premises, which are continually reinforced by the surrounding society."

A more benign example is Donald Winnicott's concept of a "transitional object" (such as a teddy bear) that links and attaches child and mother. Even so, the mother must eventually teach the child to detach from this object, lest the child become overly dependent upon it. Stiegler claims that the transitional object is "the origin of works of art and, more generally, of the life of the mind."

Emphasizing the third sense of pharmakon as scapegoat, but touching on the other senses, Boucher and Roussel treat Quebec as a pharmakon in light of the discourse surrounding the Barbara Kay controversy and the Quebec sovereignty movement. (Note: "Pharmakon was usually a symbolic scapegoat invested with the sum of the corruption of a community. Seen as a poison, it was subsequently excluded from a community in times of crisis as a form of social catharsis, thus becoming a remedy for the city. We argue that, in many ways, Quebec can be both a poison and a remedy in terms of Canadian foreign policy.")

Persson uses the several senses of pharmakon to "pursue a kind of phenomenology of drugs as embodied processes, an approach that foregrounds the productive potential of medicines; their capacity to reconfigure bodies and diseases in multiple, unpredictable ways." Highlighting the notion (from Derrida) that the effect of the pharmakon is contextual rather than causal, Persson's basic claim – with reference to the body-shape-changing lipodystrophy experienced by some HIV patients taking anti-retroviral therapy. (Note: "the ambivalent quality of pharmakon is more than purely a matter of ‘wrong drug, wrong dose, wrong route of administration, wrong patient’. Drugs, as is the case with anti-retroviral therapy, have the capacity to be beneficial and detrimental to the same person at the same time.")

It may be necessary to distinguish between "pharmacology" that operates in the multiple senses in which that term is understood here, and a further therapeutic response to the (effect of) the pharmakon in question. Referring to the hypothesis that the use of digital technology – understood as a pharmakon of attention – is correlated with "Attention Deficit Disorder", Stiegler wonders to what degree digital relational technologies can "give birth to new attentional forms". To continue the theme above on a therapeutic response: Vattimo compares interpretation to a virus; in his essay responding to this quote, Zabala says that the virus is onto-theology, and that interpretation is the "most appropriate pharmakon of onto-theology." (Note: [O]ne cannot talk with impunity of interpretation; interpretation is like a virus or even a pharmakon that affects everything it comes into contact with. On the one hand, it reduces all reality to message – erasing the distinction between Natur and Geisteswissenschaften, since even the so-called "hard" sciences verify and falsify their statements only within paradigms or pre-understandings. If "facts" thus appear to be nothing but interpretations, interpretation, on the other hand, presents itself as (the) fact: hermeneutics is not a philosophy but the enunciation of historical existence itself in the age of the end of metaphysics[.]) Zabala further remarks: "I believe that finding a pharmakon can be functionally understood as the goal that many post-metaphysical philosophers have given themselves since Heidegger, after whom philosophy has become a matter of therapy rather than discovery[.]"

== See also ==
- Externality
- Philosophy of technology
