= Demonic non-determinism =

In computer science, demonic non-determinism is a term which describes the execution of a non-deterministic program where all choices are made in favour of non-termination.

== Example ==
Take the following, where interval notation represents demonic choice of an arbitrary number in said interval.

x = 1;
while (0 < x) {
  x = [-1, 1];
}

In every while loop iteration, demonic non-determinism would prefer to choose an arbitrary value in the half-open interval $(0, 1]$, to ensure that the condition 0 < x is always true, ensuring non-termination.

== Abstract Interpretation ==
In abstract interpretation, the concretization of an element of an abstract lattice is chosen from in terms of demonic non-determinism. This is best seen in the abstract interpretation of while loops, where an example such as the one above may appear naturally.
