= Accidental necessity =

In philosophy and logic, accidental necessity, often stated in its Latin form, necessitas per accidens, refers to the necessity attributed to the past by certain views of time. It is a controversial concept: its supporters argue that it has intuitive validity while others contest it creates a contradiction in terms by positing such a thing as a "contingent necessity." It is especially important in contemporary discussions of logical and theological fatalism.
