= Angelic non-determinism =

In computer science, angelic non-determinism is the execution of a nondeterministic algorithm where particular choices are declared to always favor a desired result, if that result is possible.

For example, in halting analysis of a nondeterministic Turing machine, the choices would always favor termination of the program.

In static analysis, the holes in a template used for program analysis are filled by angelic non-determinism to favor the desired synthesis constraints.

The "angelic" terminology comes from the Christian religious conventions of angels being benevolent and acting on behalf of an omniscient God.
