= Predeterminism =

Philosophy that all events, past, present, and future, have already been established

Predeterminism is the philosophy that all events of history, past, present and future, have already been decided or are already known (by God, fate, or some other force), including human actions.

Predeterminism is closely related to determinism. The concept of predeterminism is often argued by invoking causal determinism, implying that there is an unbroken chain of prior occurrences stretching back to infinity. In the case of predeterminism, this chain of events has been pre-established, and human actions cannot interfere with the outcomes of this pre-established chain. Predeterminism can be used to mean such pre-established causal determinism, in which case it is categorised as a specific type of determinism. It can also be used interchangeably with causal determinism—in the context of its capacity to determine future events. Despite this, predeterminism is often considered as independent of causal determinism. The term predeterminism is also frequently used in the context of biology and heredity, in which case it represents a form of biological determinism.

== Definitional difficulties ==
Predeterminism is difficult to discuss because its simple definition can logically lead to a variety of similar, complex (and, perhaps, better defined) concepts in metaphysics, theology, and the philosophy of free will. The term predeterminism suggests not just a determining of all events, but the prior and deliberately conscious determining of all events (therefore done, presumably, by a conscious being). Due to this, predeterminism and the similar term determinism are easily and often confused or associated with ideas ranging, for instance, from the physicalist (and often scientific) notion of causal determinism to even the theological (and often religious) notion of predestination.

A secular example to try to illustrate predeterminism is that a fetus's future physical, emotional, and other personal characteristics as a matured human being may be considered "predetermined" by heredity, i.e. derived from a chain of events going back long before their eventual birth. However, one of the difficulties with defining predeterminism using this example is that the word predetermine necessarily implies a conscious being "doing" the determining ahead of time. With regards to predetermined heredity, a conscious being (perhaps a genetic scientist) is presumed to be the one speculating on what the fetus's personal characteristics will turn out to be, for example, based on looking at the genomes of the fetus and its ancestors. If there were not this conscious entity, the scientist, then one could say merely that the fetus's characteristics are determined by heredity, rather than predetermined. Predeterminism necessarily implies, at the very least, a passive but all-knowing observer, if not an active planner, designer, or manipulator (of the fetus's personal characteristics). This basic scientific idea of hereditary determination, though, already fulfills the definition of causal determinism, a metaphysical concept.

While determinism usually refers to a naturalistically explainable causality of events, predeterminism seems by definition to suggest a person or a "someone" who is controlling or planning the causality of events before they occur and who then perhaps resides beyond the natural, causal universe. This creates a definitional conflict because predeterminism, by this understanding, logically leads to a belief in the existence of a conscious being who must determine all actions and events in advance and who, possessing such seeming omnipotence, almost certainly operates outside of the laws of nature. This conscious entity is probably, then, a being who is omnipotent as well as presumably supernatural and omniscient. The definitional confusion here is that there is already a name for this very concept: predestination. Predestination asserts that a supremely powerful being has, in advance, fixed all events and outcomes in the universe; it is a famous doctrine of the Calvinists in Christian theology.

Likewise, the doctrine of fatalism already explicitly attributes all events and outcomes to the will of a (vaguer) higher power such as fate or destiny. Furthermore, in philosophic debates about the compatibility of free will and determinism, some argue that predeterminism back to the origin of the universe is simply what philosophers mean by the more common term "determinism." Others have suggested that the term "self-determination" be used to describe actions as merely "determined" by an agent's reasons, motives, and desires.

When various interpretation of the word predeterminism can be defined even better by other terms, such as the aforementioned determinism, predestination, or fatalism, then the definition of predeterminism itself appears awkward, unclear, and perhaps even worthless in terms of practical or philosophic discussion.

== R. E. Hobart ==
R. E. Hobart is the pseudonym of Dickinson S. Miller, a student of William James who was later one of James' closest personal friends and for some years a colleague in the Harvard philosophy department. Hobart (Miller) criticized the core idea of James' The Will to Believe, namely that it was acceptable to hold religious faith in the absence of evidence for or against that faith. James referred to Miller as "my most penetrating critic and intimate enemy".

Nearly 25 years after James' death, R. E. Hobart published a short article in Mind in 1934 that is considered one of the definitive statements of determinism and compatibilism. It was entitled Free Will as Involving Determination and Inconceivable Without It.

Hobart's compatibilism was similar to earlier landmark positions by Thomas Hobbes and David Hume, as refined in the 19th-century compatibilist views of John Stuart Mill, Henry Sidgwick, and F. H. Bradley. But unlike them Hobart explicitly did not endorse strict logical or physical determinism, and he explicitly did endorse the existence of alternative possibilities, which can depend on absolute chance.

He was writing just a few years after the discovery of quantum mechanics and indeterminacy, and also makes passing mention of the ancient "swerve" of the atoms espoused by Epicurus:

'I am not maintaining that determinism is true...it is not here affirmed that there are no small exceptions, no slight undetermined swervings, no ingredient of absolute chance.'

'"We say," I can will this or I can will that, whichever I choose". Two courses of action present themselves to my mind. I think of their consequences, I look on this picture and on that, one of them commends itself more than the other, and I will an act that brings it about. I knew that I could choose either. That means that I had the power to choose either.'

Hobart supports the existence of alternative possibilities for action and the capability to do otherwise.

And he clearly prefers "determination" to "determinism." Hobart's article is frequently misquoted as "Free Will as Involving Determinism."

== Philippa Foot ==
Philippa Foot is one who misquoted Hobart's title, but who had the same misgivings about determinism.

In 1957 she wrote an article in The Philosophical Review entitled "Free Will As Involving Determinism."

Nevertheless, she criticized arguments that free will requires indeterminism, and in particular the idea that one could not be held responsible for "chance" actions chosen for no particular reason.

Her article begins with the observation that determinism has become widely accepted as compatible with free will.

"The idea that free will can be reconciled with the strictest determinism is now very widely accepted. To say that a man acted freely is, it is often suggested, to say that he was not constrained, or that he could have done otherwise if he had chosen, or something else of that kind; and since these things could be true even if his action was determined it seems that there could be room for free will even within a universe completely subject to causal laws."

Foot doubted that the ordinary language meaning of saying our actions are "determined" by motives has the same meaning as strict physical determinism, which assumes a causal law that determines every event in the future of the universe.

She notes that our normal use of "determined" does not imply universal determinism.

"For instance, an action said to be determined by the desires of the man who does it is not necessarily an action for which there is supposed to be a sufficient condition. In saying that it is determined by his desires we may mean merely that he is doing something that he wants to do, or that he is doing it for the sake of something else that he wants. There is nothing in this to suggest determinism in Russell's sense."

Foot cited Bertrand Russell's view of causal determinism:

"The law of universal causation . . . may be enunciated as follows:...given the state of the whole universe,...every previous and subsequent event can theoretically be determined."
