= Underdeterminacy (law) =

In American law, underdeterminacy is a concept particularly relevant to originalism. It is distinct from indeterminacy. The problem arises because even having established the original meaning of a clause of the Constitution, "knowing the meaning of these words only takes us so far in resolving current cases and controversies. Due either to ambiguity or vagueness, the original meaning of the text may not always determine a unique rule of law to be applied to a particular case or controversy. While not indeterminate, the original meaning can be underdeterminate" (R. Barnett, The original meaning of the Commerce Clause , text accompanying note 37).

Underdeterminacy is crucial to originalism, because it creates an important question of what an originalist judge should do in cases of underdeterminacy; different scholars and judges have proposed various alternatives, ranging from using tradition to fill in the gaps (Scalia) to disempowering the judge to rule (Bork, Strang).
