= Deterministic system =

System in which no randomness is involved in determining its future states

In mathematics, computer science and physics, a deterministic system is a system in which no randomness is involved in the development of future states of the system. A deterministic model will thus always produce the same output from a given starting condition or initial state.

== In physics ==
The trajectory of a projectile launched from a cannon is modeled by an ODE that is derived from Newton's second law.

Physical laws that are described by differential equations represent deterministic systems, even though the state of the system at a given point in time may be difficult to describe explicitly. In quantum mechanics, the Schrödinger equation, which describes the continuous time evolution of a system's wave function, is deterministic. However, the relationship between a system's wave function and the observable properties of the system appears to be non-deterministic.

== In mathematics ==
The systems studied in chaos theory are deterministic. If the initial state were known exactly, then the future state of such a system could theoretically be predicted. However, in practice, knowledge about the future state is limited by the precision with which the initial state can be measured, and chaotic systems are characterized by a strong dependence on the initial conditions. This sensitivity to initial conditions can be measured with Lyapunov exponents. Markov chains and other random walks are not deterministic systems, because their development depends on random choices.

== In computer science ==
A deterministic model of computation, for example a deterministic Turing machine, is a model of computation such that the successive states of the machine and the operations to be performed are completely determined by the preceding state. A deterministic algorithm is an algorithm which, given a particular input, will always produce the same output, with the underlying machine always passing through the same sequence of states.

There may be non-deterministic algorithms that run on a deterministic machine, for example, an algorithm that relies on random choices. Generally, for such random choices, one uses a pseudorandom number generator, but one may also use some external physical process, such as the last digits of the time given by the computer clock. A pseudorandom number generator is a deterministic algorithm, that is designed to produce sequences of numbers that behave as random sequences. A hardware random number generator, however, may be non-deterministic.

== In economics ==
In economics, the Ramsey–Cass–Koopmans model is deterministic. The stochastic equivalent is known as real business-cycle theory. As determinism relates to modeling in the natural sciences, a deterministic model uses existing data to model the future behavior of a system. The deterministic model is useful for systems that do not experience frequent or unexpected behavior - unless that behavior is already present in the system via existing data. This type of modeling is distinct from stochastic modeling or forward modeling. Stochastic modeling uses random data in the model while forward modeling uses a given model to predict future behavior in a system. Deterministic models are used across the natural sciences, including geology, oceanography, physics, and other disciplines.

== See also ==
- Deterministic system (philosophy)
- Dynamical system
- Scientific modelling
- Statistical model
- Stochastic process
