= Jarl Charpentier =

Swedish academic and linguist (1884–1935)

Jarl Charpentier (17 December 1884, Göteborg, Sweden – 5 July 1935, Uppsala, Sweden) was a Swedish academic and linguist who worked at Uppsala University.

Charpentier's research focused on Sanskrit literature but he was also interested in Indo-European comparative linguistics, including Iranistics, especially questions of etymology.

== Selected publications ==
- Charpentier, J. ed., (1922). The Uttaradhyayanasutra. Lehmann & Stage.
- Charpentier, J., (1927). "The Meaning and Etymology of Puja." Indian Antiquary, 56, pp. 93–98.
- Charpentier, J., (1931). "Antiochus, King of the Yavanas." Bulletin of the School of Oriental and African Studies, 6(2), pp. 303–321.
