= Indeterminacy (philosophy) =

Philosophical terms

Indeterminacy, in philosophy, can refer both to common scientific and mathematical concepts of uncertainty and their implications and to another kind of indeterminacy deriving from the nature of definition or meaning. It is related to deconstructionism and to Nietzsche's criticism of the Kantian noumenon.

== Indeterminacy in philosophy ==
=== Introduction ===
The problem of indeterminacy arises when one observes the eventual circularity of virtually every possible definition. It is easy to find loops of definition in any dictionary, because this seems to be the only way that certain concepts, and generally very important ones such as that of existence, can be defined in the English language. A definition is a collection of other words, and in any finite dictionary if one continues to follow the trail of words in search of the precise meaning of any given term, one will inevitably encounter this linguistic indeterminacy.

Philosophers and scientists generally try to eliminate indeterminate terms from their arguments, since any indeterminate thing is unquantifiable and untestable; similarly, any hypothesis which consists of a statement of the properties of something unquantifiable or indefinable cannot be falsified and thus cannot be said to be supported by evidence that does not falsify it. This is related to Popper's discussions of falsifiability in his works on the scientific method. The quantifiability of data collected during an experiment is central to the scientific method, since reliable conclusions can only be drawn from replicable experiments, and since in order to establish observer agreement scientists must be able to quantify experimental evidence.

=== Kant and hazards of positing the "thing in itself" ===
Immanuel Kant unwittingly proposed one answer to this question in his Critique of Pure Reason by stating that there must "exist" a "thing in itself" – a thing which is the cause of phenomena, but not a phenomenon itself. But, so to speak, "approximations" of "things in themselves" crop up in many models of empirical phenomena. Singularities in physics, such as gravitational singularities, certain aspects of which (e.g., their unquantifiability) can seem almost to mirror various "aspects" of the proposed "thing in itself", are generally eliminated (or attempts are made at eliminating them) in newer, more precise models of the universe. Definitions of various psychiatric disorders stem, according to philosophers who draw on the work of Michel Foucault, from a belief that something unobservable and indescribable is fundamentally "wrong" with the mind of whoever suffers from such a disorder. Proponents of Foucault's treatment of the concept of insanity would assert that one need only try to quantify various characteristics of such disorders as presented in today's Diagnostic and Statistical Manual (e.g., delusion, one of the diagnostic criteria which must be exhibited by a patient if he or she is to be considered to have schizophrenia) in order to discover that the field of study known as abnormal psychology relies upon indeterminate concepts in defining virtually each "mental disorder" it describes. The quality that makes a belief a delusion is indeterminate to the extent to which it is unquantifiable; arguments that delusion is determined by popular sentiment (i.e., "almost no-one believes that he or she is made of cheese, and thus that belief is a delusion") would lead to the conclusion that, for example, Alfred Wegener's assertion of continental drift was a delusion since it was dismissed for decades after it was made.

=== Nietzsche and the indeterminacy of the "thing in itself" ===
Relevant criticism of Kant's original formulation of the "thing in itself" can be found in the works of Friedrich Wilhelm Nietzsche, who argued against what he held to be the indeterminate nature of such concepts as the Platonic idea, the subject, the Kantian noumenon, the opposition of "appearance" to "reality", etc. Nietzsche concisely argued against Kant's noumenon in his On Truth and Lies in a Nonmoral Sense as follows:

"The 'thing in itself' (which is precisely what the pure truth, apart from any of its consequences, would be) is likewise something quite incomprehensible to the creator of language and something not in the least worth striving for."

In his Beyond Good and Evil, Nietzsche argues against the "misleading significance of words" and its production of a "thing in itself":

"I would repeat it, however, a hundred times, that 'immediate certainty,' as well as 'absolute knowledge' and the 'thing in itself,' involve a CONTRADICTIO IN ADJECTO; we really ought to free ourselves from the misleading significance of words!"

Furthermore, Nietzsche argued against such singularities as the atom in the scientific models of his day in The Will to Power:

"For all its detachment and freedom from emotion, our science is still the dupe of linguistic habits; it has never got rid of those changelings called 'subjects.' The atom is one such changeling, another is the Kantian 'thing-in-itself.'"

=== Approximation versus equality ===
The concept of something that is unapproachable but always further-approximable has led to a rejection by philosophers like Nietzsche of the concept of exact equality in general in favor of that of approximate similarity:

"Every word instantly becomes a concept precisely insofar as it is not supposed to serve as a reminder of the unique and entirely individual original experience to which it owes its origin; but rather, a word becomes a concept insofar as it simultaneously has to fit countless more or less similar cases – which means, purely and simply, cases which are never equal and thus altogether unequal."

"What then is truth? A movable host of metaphors, metonymies, and; anthropomorphisms: in short, a sum of human relations which have been poetically and rhetorically intensified, transferred, and embellished, and which, after long usage, seem to a people to be fixed, canonical, and binding. Truths are illusions which we have forgotten are illusions- they are metaphors that have become worn out and have been drained of sensuous force, coins which have lost their embossing and are now considered as metal and no longer as coins."

If one states an equation between two things, one states, in effect, that they are the same thing. It can be argued that this cannot possibly be true, since one will then consider the properties which the two sides of the equation share – that which makes them "equal" – but one also can, and does, consider them as two separate concepts. Even in a mathematical statement as simple as "x=x", one encounters fundamental differences between the two "x"es under consideration: firstly, that there are two distinct "x"es, in that they neither occupy the same space on this page nor in one's own mind. There would otherwise be only one "x". Secondly, that if two things were absolutely equal in every possible respect, then there would necessarily be no reason to consider their equality. Nothing could lead anyone to consider the possibility or impossibility of their equality if there were no properties not shared between "them", since there would necessarily be no relationship between them whatsoever. Thirdly, and most importantly, if two things were equal in every possible respect they would necessarily not be two things, but the very same thing, since there would be no difference to separate them.

In examples as odd as this, the differences between two approximately equal things may be very small indeed, and it is certainly true that they are quite irrelevant to most discussions. Acceptance of the reflexive property illustrated above has led to useful mathematical discoveries which have influenced the life of anyone reading this article on a computer. But in an examination of the possibility of the determinacy of any possible concept, differences like this are supremely relevant since that quality which could possibly make two separate things "equal" seems to be indeterminate.

=== Indeterminacy of meaning and translation ===
See:

- Willard Van Orman Quine: indeterminacy of translation, indeterminacy of reference
- Donald Davidson: indeterminacy of interpretation

=== The indeterminacy of the pharmakon in Derrida's Plato's Pharmacy ===
Indeterminacy was discussed in one of Jacques Derrida's early works Plato's Pharmacy (1969), a reading of Plato's Phaedrus and Phaedo. Plato writes of a fictionalized conversation between Socrates and a student, in which Socrates tries to convince the student that writing is inferior to speech. Socrates uses the Egyptian myth of Thoth's creation of writing to illustrate his point. As the story goes, Thoth presents his invention to the god-king of Upper Egypt for judgment. Upon its presentation, Thoth offers script as a pharmakon for the Egyptian people. The Greek word pharmakon poses a quandary for translators: it is both a remedy and a poison. In the proffering of a pharmakon, Thoth presents it as its true meaning: a harm and benefit. The god-king, however, refuses the invention. Through various reasonings, he determines the pharmakon of writing to be a bad thing for the Egyptian people. The pharmakon, the undecidable, has been returned decided. The problem, as Derrida reasons, is this: since the word pharmakon, in the original Greek, means both a remedy and a poison, it cannot be determined as fully remedy or fully poison. Amon rejected writing as fully poison in Socrates' retelling of the tale, thus shutting out the other possibilities.

=== Foucault and the indeterminacy of insanity ===
The philosopher Michel Foucault wrote about the existence of such problems of precise definition in the very concept of insanity itself – a very rough approximation of his argument can be found in the late social commentator and journalist Hunter S. Thompson's book, Kingdom of Fear:

"The only difference between the Sane and the Insane, is IN and yet within this world, the Sane have the power to have the Insane locked up."

Another summary of Foucault's original argument against the indeterminacy of the concept of insanity in his Madness and Civilization can be found in the following excerpt from the Literature, Arts, and Medicine Database:

"Central to this is the notion of confinement as a meaningful exercise. Foucault's history explains how the mad came first to be confined; how they became identified as confined due to moral and economic factors that determined those who ought to be confined; how they became perceived as dangerous through their confinement, partly by way of atavistic identification with the lepers whose place they had come to occupy; how they were 'liberated' by Pinel and Tuke, but in their liberation remained confined, both physically in asylums and in the designation of being mad; and how this confinement subsequently became enacted in the figure of the psychiatrist, whose practice is 'a certain moral tactic contemporary with the end of the eighteenth century, preserved in the rites of the asylum life, and overlaid by the myths of positivism.' Science and medicine, notably, come in at the later stages, as practices 'elaborated once this division' between the mad and the sane has been made (ix)."

In The Archaeology of Knowledge, Foucault addresses indeterminacy directly by discussing the origin of the meaning of concepts:

"Foucault directs his analysis toward the 'statement', the basic unit of discourse that he believes has been ignored up to this point. 'Statement' is the English translation from French énoncé (that which is enunciated or expressed), which has a peculiar meaning for Foucault. 'Énoncé' for Foucault means that which makes propositions, utterances, or speech acts meaningful. In this understanding, statements themselves are not propositions, utterances, or speech acts. Rather, statements create a network of rules establishing what is meaningful, and it is these rules that are the preconditions for propositions, utterances, or speech acts to have meaning. Statements are also 'events'. Depending on whether or not they comply with the rules of meaning, a grammatically correct sentence may still lack meaning and inversely, an incorrect sentence may still be meaningful. Statements depend on the conditions in which they emerge and exist within a field of discourse. It is huge collections of statements, called discursive formations, toward which Foucault aims his analysis.

[...]

Rather than looking for a deeper meaning underneath discourse or looking for the source of meaning in some transcendental subject, Foucault analyzes the conditions of existence for meaning. In order to show the principles of meaning production in various discursive formations he details how truth claims emerge during various epochs on the basis of what was actually said and written during these periods of time."

The difference described by Foucault between the sane and the insane does have observable and very real effects on millions of people daily and can be characterized in terms of those effects, but it can also serve to illustrate a particular effect of the indeterminacy of definition: i.e., that insofar as the general public tends not to characterize or define insanity in very precise terms, it tends, according to Foucault, unnecessarily and arbitrarily to confine some of its members on an irrational basis. The less-precisely such states as "insanity" and "criminality" are defined in a society, the more likely that society is to fail to continue over time to describe the same behaviors as characteristic of those states (or, alternately, to characterize such states in terms of the same behaviors).

=== Indeterminacy in discourse analysis ===
Steve Hoenisch asserts in his article Interpretation and Indeterminacy in Discourse Analysis that "[T]he exact meaning of a speaker's utterance in a contextualized exchange is often indeterminate. Within the context of the analysis of the teacher-pupil exchange, I will argue for the superiority of interactional linguistics over speech act theory because it reduces the indeterminacy and yields a more principled interpretation[...]".

=== Indeterminacy and consciousness ===
Richard Dawkins, who coined the term meme in the 1970s, described the concept of faith in his documentary Root of All Evil? as "the process of non-thinking". In the documentary, he used Bertrand Russell's analogy between a teapot orbiting the Sun (something that cannot be observed because the brightness of the Sun would obscure it even from the best telescope's view) and the object of one's faith (in this particular case, God) to explain that a highly indeterminate idea can self-replicate freely: "Everybody in the society had faith in the teapot. Stories of the teapot had been handed down for generations as part of the tradition of society. There are holy books about the teapot."

In Darwin's Dangerous Idea, Daniel Dennett argues against the existence of determinate meaning (in this case, of the subjective experience of vision for frogs) via an explanation of their indeterminacy in the chapter entitled The Evolution of Meanings, in the section The Quest for Real Meanings:

Unless there were 'meaningless' or 'indeterminate' variation in the triggering conditions of the various frogs' eyes, there could be no raw material [...] for selection for a new purpose to act upon. The indeterminacy that Fodor (and others) see as a flaw [...] is actually a prediction for such evolution [of "purpose"]. The idea that there must be something determinate that the frog's eye really means – some possibly unknowable proposition in froggish that expresses exactly what the frog's eye is telling the frog's brain – is just essentialism applied to meaning (or function). Meaning, like function on which it so directly depends, is not something determinate at its birth.

Dennet argues, controversially, against qualia in Consciousness Explained. Qualia are attacked from several directions at once: he maintains they do not exist (or that they are too ill-defined to play any role in science, or that they are really something else, i.e. behavioral dispositions). They cannot simultaneously have all the properties attributed to them by philosophers—incorrigible, ineffable, private, directly accessible and so on. The multiple drafts theory is leveraged to show that facts about qualia are not definite. Critics object that one's own qualia are subjectively quite clear and distinct to oneself.

The self-replicating nature of memes is a partial explanation of the recurrence of indeterminacies in language and thought. The wide influences of Platonism and Kantianism in Western philosophy can arguably be partially attributed to the indeterminacies of some of their most fundamental concepts (namely, the Idea and the Noumenon, respectively).

For a given meme to exhibit replication and heritability – that is, for it to be able to make an imperfect copy of itself which is more likely to share any given trait with its "parent" meme than with some random member of the general "population" of memes – it must in some way be mutable, since memetic replication occurs by means of human conceptual imitation rather than via the discrete molecular processes that govern genetic replication. (If a statement were to generate copies of itself that didn't meaningfully differ from it, that process of copying would more accurately be described as "duplication" than as "replication", and it would be incorrect to term these statements "memes"; the same would be true if the "child" statements did not noticeably inherit a substantial proportion of their traits from their "parent" statements.) In other words, if a meme is defined roughly (and somewhat arbitrarily) as a statement (or as a collection of statements, like Foucault's "discursive formations") that inherits some, but not all, of its properties (or elements of its definition) from its "parent" memes and which self-replicates, then indeterminacy of definition could be seen as advantageous to memetic replication, since an absolute rigidity of definition would preclude memetic adaptation.

Indeterminacy in linguistics can arguably partially be defeated by the fact that languages are always changing. However, what the entire language and its collected changes continue to reflect is sometimes still considered to be indeterminate.

=== Criticism ===
Persons of faith argue that faith "is the basis of all knowledge". The Wikipedia article on faith states that "one must assume, believe, or have faith in the credibility of a person, place, thing, or idea in order to have a basis for knowledge." In this way the object of one's faith is similar to Kant's noumenon.

This would seem to attempt to make direct use of the indeterminacy of the object of one's faith as evidential support of its existence: if the object of one's faith were to be proven to exist (i.e., if it were no longer of indeterminate definition, or if it were no longer unquantifiable, etc.), then faith in that object would no longer be necessary; arguments from authority such as those mentioned above wouldn't either; all that would be needed to prove its existence would be scientific evidence. Thus, if faith is to be considered as a reliable basis for knowledge, persons of faith would seem, in effect, to assert that indeterminacy is not only necessary, but good (see Nassim Taleb).

== Indeterminacy in new physical theories ==
Science generally attempts to eliminate vague definitions, causally inert entities, and indeterminate properties, via further observation, experimentation, characterization, and explanation. Occam's razor tends to eliminate causally inert entities from functioning models of quantifiable phenomena, but some quantitative models, such as quantum mechanics, actually imply certain indeterminacies, such as the relative indeterminacy of quantum particles' positions to the precision with which their momenta can be measured (and vice versa). (See Heisenberg's indeterminacy principle.)

One ardent supporter of the possibility of a final unifying theory (and thus, arguably, of the possibility of the end of some current indeterminacies) in physics, Steven Weinberg, stated in an interview with PBS that:

"Sometimes [...] people say that surely there's no final theory because, after all, every time we've made a step toward unification or toward simplification we always find more and more complexity there. That just means we haven't found it yet. Physicists never thought they had the final theory."

The Wikipedia article on the possibility of such a "theory of everything" notes that

"Other possibilities which may frustrate the explanatory capacity of a TOE may include sensitivity to the boundary conditions of the universe, or the existence of mathematical chaos in its solutions, making its predictions precise, but useless."

Chaos theory argues that precise prediction of the behavior of complex systems becomes impossible because of the observer's inability to gather all necessary data.

As yet, it seems entirely possible that there shall never be any "final theory" of all phenomena, and that, rather, explanations may instead breed more and more complex and exact explanations of the new phenomena uncovered by current experimentation. In this argument, the "indeterminacy" or "thing in itself" is the "final explanation" that will never be reached; this can be compared to the concept of the limit in calculus, in that quantities may approach, but never reach, a given limit in certain situations.

=== Criticism ===
Proponents of a deterministic universe have criticised various applications of the concept of indeterminacy in the sciences; for instance, Albert Einstein once stated that "God does not play dice" in a succinct (but now unpopular) argument against the theory of quantum indeterminacy, which states that the actions of particles of extremely low mass or energy are unpredictable because an observer's interaction with them changes either their positions or momenta. (The "dice" in Einstein's metaphor refer to the probabilities that these particles will behave in particular ways, which is how quantum mechanics addressed the problem.)

At first it might seem that a criticism could be made from a biological standpoint in that an indeterminate idea would seem not to be beneficial to the species that holds it. A strong counterargument, however, is that not all traits exhibited by living organisms will be seen in the long term as evolutionarily advantageous, given that extinctions occur regularly and that phenotypic traits have often died out altogether – in other words, an indeterminate meme may in the long term demonstrate its evolutionary value to the species that produced it in either direction; humans are, as yet, the only species known to make use of such concepts. It might also be argued that conceptual vagueness is an inevitability, given the limited capacity of the human nervous systems. We just do not have enough neurons to maintain separate concepts for "dog with 1,000,000 hairs", "dog with 1,000,001 hairs" and so on. But conceptual vagueness is not metaphysical indeterminacy.

== Synonymous concepts in philosophy ==
Uncertainty and indeterminacy are words for essentially the same concept in both quantum mechanics. Unquantifiability, and undefinability (or indefinability), can also sometimes be synonymous with indeterminacy. In science, indeterminacy can sometimes be interchangeable with unprovability or unpredictability. Also, anything entirely inobservable can be said to be indeterminate in that it cannot be precisely characterized.

== See also ==
- Indeterminacy of translation
- Anti-realism
- Causality
- Causal loop
- Definition
- Deterministic system (philosophy)
- Event (philosophy)
- Indeterminacy (literature)
- Indeterminism
- Meaning
- Occam's razor
- Pharmakon (philosophy)
- Philosophy of science
- Quantifiability
- Quintessence
- Stochastics
- Thing in itself
- Underdetermination
- Vagueness
