= Determinable =

Determinable may refer to:

- Fee simple, an estate in land, a form of freehold ownership
- Determinable attributes of an object in philosophy

== See also ==
- Determiner
- Determine (horse)
