= Indeterminacy in computation =

Indeterminacy is a property of formal systems that evolve in time (often conceptualized as a computation), in which complete information about the internal state of the system at some point in time admits multiple future trajectories.

In simpler terms, if such a system is returned to the same initial condition—or two identical copies of the system are started at the same time—they won't with certainty produce the same behaviour, as some element of chance is able to enter the system from outside its formal specification.

In some cases the indeterminacy arises from the laws of physics, in other cases it leaks in from the abstract model, and sometimes the model includes an explicit source of indeterminacy, as with deliberately randomized algorithms, for the benefits that this provides.

== Disambiguation ==
Indeterminacy in computation may refer to:

- quantum indeterminacy in quantum computers
- nondeterministic finite automata
- nondeterministic algorithm

In concurrency:

- indeterminacy in concurrent computation
- unbounded nondeterminism
