= Deterministic system (philosophy) =

Causality and Determinisim

A deterministic system is a conceptual model of the philosophical doctrine of determinism applied to a system for understanding everything that has and will occur in the system, based on the physical outcomes of causality. In a deterministic system, every action, or cause, produces a reaction, or effect, and every reaction, in turn, becomes the cause of subsequent reactions. The totality of these cascading events can theoretically show exactly how the system will exist at any moment in time.

To understand this concept, start with a fairly small system. Visualize a set of three dominoes lined up in a row with each domino less than a domino's length away from its neighbors. Once the first domino has toppled, the third domino will topple because the second will topple upon being contacted by the first domino.

Small deterministic systems are easy to visualize, but are necessarily linked to the rest of reality by an initial cause and/or final effect. To go back to the dominoes, something outside the system has to cause the first domino to topple. The last domino falling might cause something else outside the system to happen. And the system itself must be considered in isolation: if external forces such as hurricanes, earthquakes, or the hands of nearby people were taken into consideration, the final domino toppling might not be a predetermined outcome. Complete isolation of a system is unrealistic, but useful for understanding what would normally happen to a system when the possibility of external influences is negligible. Complex physical systems are necessarily built using simpler ones, and using isolated systems as a starting model can help bridge the gap, and aid in understanding. The domino example is developed in the Petri net computational model.

This example assumes that dominoes toppling into each other behave deterministically. Even the above-mentioned external forces which might interrupt the system are causes which the system did not consider, but which could be explained by cause and effect in a larger deterministic system.

== Some deterministic systems ==
- Classical physics is the deterministic system assumed in the domino example which scientists can use to describe all events which take place on a scale larger than individual atoms. Classical physics includes Newton's laws of motion, Classical electrodynamics, thermodynamics, the Special theory of relativity, the General theory of relativity, chaos theory and nonlinear dynamics. Some of these systems are complex, and events may be difficult to predict in practice, but if the starting conditions were known in enough detail, the outcomes of events in such systems could be predicted.
- Nearly all electronic computers in use today are based on theoretical von Neumann computers or Turing machines, i.e.: they are devices that perform one small, deterministic step at a time. If all inputs are specified, the computer will always produce a particular output which is calculated deterministically. Computer scientists also study other models of computation including parallel computers (more than one deterministic step at a time), and quantum computers (which are based on non-deterministic quantum mechanical models). Computer systems or programs are often described as non-deterministic if their behavior depends on factors that cannot be predicted or reliably reproduced, such as the time of day or the speed at which the user enters data at the keyboard. This, however, is a somewhat different usage of the term.
- Behaviorism, an approach to psychology based on the proposition that behavior can be researched scientifically without recourse to inner mental states, is usually considered to be deterministic and opposed to free will.

== Non-deterministic systems ==
Events without natural causes cannot be part of a deterministic system. Whether such events actually occur is a matter of philosophical and scientific debate – however, possible uncaused events include:

- Random Quantum events

Quantum physics holds that certain events such as radioactive decay and movement of particles are completely random when taken at the level of single atoms or smaller. Schrödinger's cat is a famous thought experiment in which a cat's survival cannot be determined theoretically before the experiment is done. For almost all everyday non-microscopic occurrences, however, the probability of such random events is extremely close to zero, and can be approximated to almost certainty with statistics using the correspondence principle. The philosophical consequences of quantum physics were once considered by many (including Albert Einstein) to be a major problem for the scientific method which traditionally used a strong version of scientific determinism (see Philosophy of science).

== Systems with controversial classification ==
Some systems are particularly difficult to classify as deterministic or not, and have generated much philosophical debate. The major example would be human minds, and possibly animal minds too. Can people have free will if their minds are truly deterministic? Conversely, when deterministic computers are said to exhibit artificial intelligence, how are their minds similar to ours?

== The entire universe ==
The larger the deterministic system, the longer the necessary chain of cause and effect. The entire universe may be considered as such a system, which creates its own philosophical questions (see Determinism).

== See also ==
- Chaos theory
- Classical mechanics
- Classical physics
- Philosophy of science
- Quantum indeterminacy
- Quantum mechanics
- Quantum mind
- Scientific determinism
- Uncertainty principle
- Indeterminacy
