= Three-color fabric belief =

Three-color fabric in Thai belief

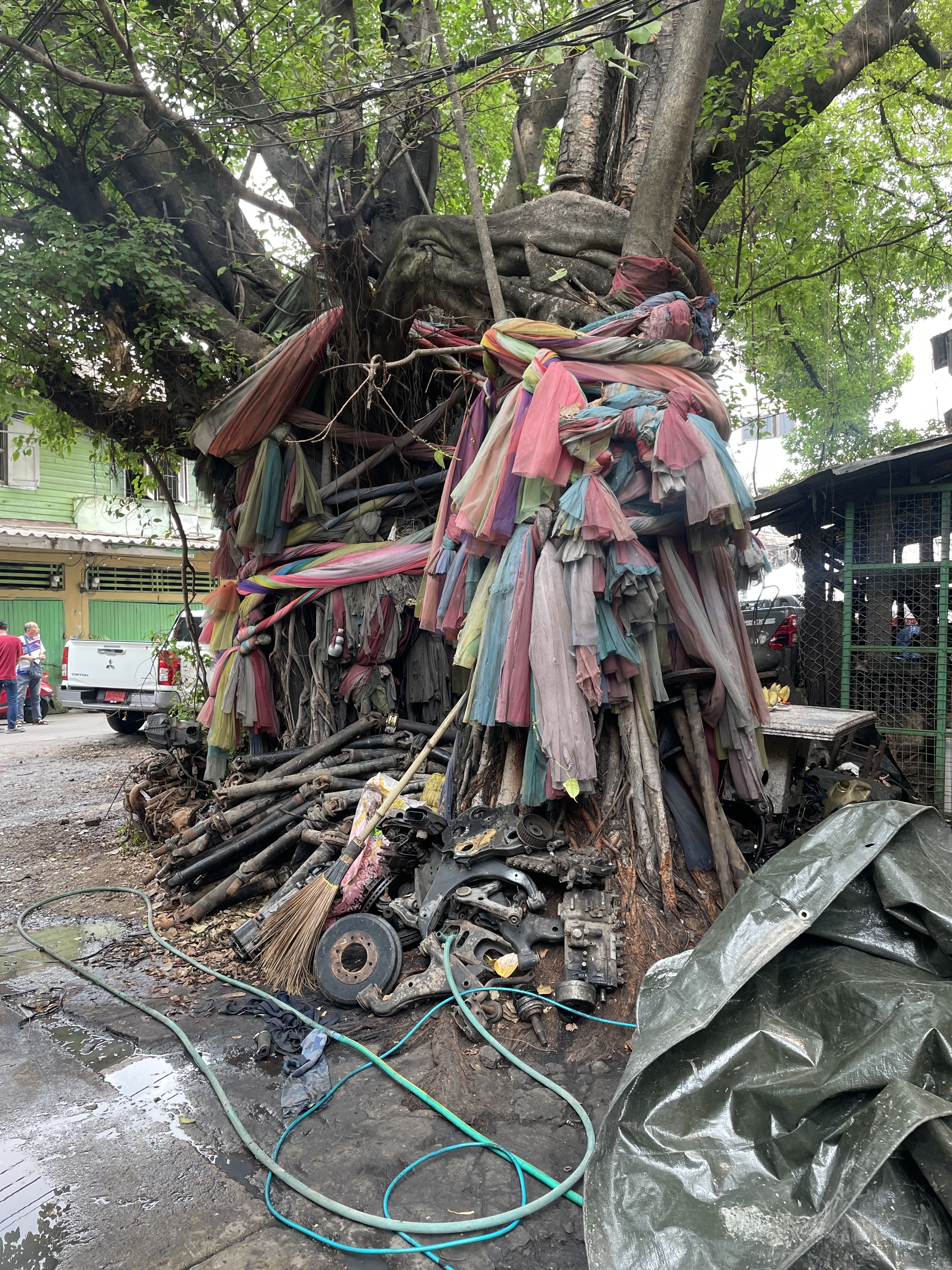

Thai three-color fabric belief is a symbolic item in Thai culture, often used to represent tradition, spirituality, and connection to the spiritual realm.

When traveling or visiting various locations in Thailand, one often notices large trees adorned with three-colored fabric wraps. In some instances, even seven-colored fabric may be used, sometimes there are also some food items and animal statues nearby.

In Thailand, the three-color fabric is very important. It shows tradition, belief, and history. People can see it in markets, shops, tied to trees, and even on vehicles. with common colors being yellow, pink, green, white, red, and blue. Furthermore, these colors are associated with Hindu beliefs that have had a long-standing influence on Thai society and culture.

This fabric represents how people, spirits, and sacred things are all connected in Thai culture. It shows respect for the spiritual world that Thai people believe in. Seeing this fabric everywhere reminds everyone of the strong connection between their past, their beliefs, and the natural world around them. This is a simple way of showing how deeply spiritual Thai culture is and how this belief is a part of everyday life.

== History ==
=== The original belief (Hindu) ===
In Thailand, wrapping fabric around vehicles or trees is a symbolic gesture known as "Ruk Kha Thewada", venerating sacred entities deeply ingrained in Thai society and widely familiar to all. This tradition, rooted in Thai culture for generations, likely stems from the historical influences of Hinduism and Buddhism from South Asia, both of which reference these divine beings. While the practice of honoring "Ruk Kha Thewada" in Thai society originated from the influence of these religions, its actual implementation evolved from the longstanding belief in spirits inherent in Southeast Asia's natural world or from spirit worship traditions. Over time, as both religions exerted their influence, these spirits became integrated into Hindu and Buddhist beliefs, often symbolically represented. This amalgamation resulted in the fusion of beliefs related to Buddha, spirits, and deities to the extent that they became inseparable (This information is based on the website of the Journal of Cultural and Art Institute, Srinakharinwirot University). Moreover, ceremonies often incorporate 3 colors fabric to bestow auspiciousness upon worshippers and pay homage to the revered deities.

== Spirits ==
Three-color fabric is deeply rooted in animistic beliefs and is a common sight throughout Thailand, particularly in rural areas.

Animism is a belief that says everything in nature, like plants, animals, and even rocks, has a special spirit inside. This is an ancient idea found in many cultures. In animism, everything, from big mountains to tiny flowers, is thought to have its own soul or spirit. This includes things that might seem lifeless, like stones and rivers.

=== Ancestor spirit ===
In Thai culture, respecting ancestor spirits is deeply ingrained, being a key aspect of religious and family customs. Ancestor veneration involves honoring deceased family members through rituals, offerings, and prayers.

=== Deities spirit ===
In Thailand, spirits and deities play significant roles in religious and cultural practices. Thai spirituality is rich with belief in various supernatural beings, including deities and spirits.

Mae Yanang is well known for three-color fabric. Mae Yanang is a deities spirit that Thai people respect as protecting vehicles such as cars and boats or is believed to reside in cars and boats. Mae Yanang also can punish bad drivers. Thai people often use three-color fabric to tie knots on their vehicles. This practice is rooted in the belief that by doing so, they can invoke the protection and care of Mae Yanang, ensuring the safety of their journeys. There are many legends and beliefs about Mae Yanang according to the beliefs of each locality.

== Fabric ==
Giving the fabric is thus a way of expressing emotions and showing respect. In ancient times, people considered fabric as a crucial element in various ceremonies and used it to demonstrate their reverence for sacred matters. Tying fabric of seven colors was believed to be a form of worship to the gods throughout the week. This practice involved arranging garlands with seven different colors, each representing a specific day as follows:

Sunday: red

Monday: soft white

Tuesday: pink

Wednesday: green

Thursday: yellow or areca nut color.

Friday: blue

Saturday: black

Black or very dark tones are uncommon, as there are no colors considered inauspicious.
