= Buddhism and Hinduism =

Buddhism and Hinduism have common origins in ancient India, which later spread and became dominant religions in Southeast Asian countries, including Cambodia and Indonesia around the 4th century CE. Buddhism arose in the Gangetic plains of Eastern India in the 5th century BCE during the second urbanisation (600–200 BCE). Hinduism developed as a fusion (Note: Lockard (2007, p. 50): "The encounters that resulted from Aryan migration brought together several very different peoples and cultures, reconfiguring Indian society. Over many centuries a fusion of Aryan and Dravidian occurred, a complex process that historians have labeled the Indo-Aryan synthesis." Lockard: "Hinduism can be seen historically as a synthesis of Aryan beliefs with Harappan and other Dravidian traditions that developed over many centuries.") or synthesis (Note: Hiltebeitel (2007, p. 12): "A period of consolidation, sometimes identified as one of 'Hindu synthesis,' 'Brahmanic synthesis,' or 'orthodox synthesis,' takes place between the time of the late Vedic Upanishads (c. 500 BCE) and the period of Gupta imperial ascendency (c. 320-467 CE).") of practices and ideas from the ancient Vedic religion and elements and deities from other local Indian traditions, including the sramanic movement and Buddhism. (Note: See also: J.H. Hutton (1931), in Ghurye (1980, pp. 3–4) (Note: Ghurye: He [Hutton] considers modern Hinduism to be the result of an amalgam between pre-Aryan Indian beliefs of Mediterranean inspiration and the religion of the Rigveda. "The Tribal religions present, as it were, surplus material not yet built into the temple of Hinduism".); Zimmer (1951, pp. 218–219); Tyler (1973), India: An Anthropological Perspective, Goodyear Publishing Company. In: Sjoberg (1990, p. 43). (Note: Tyler, in India: An Anthropological Perspective (1973), p. 68, as quoted by Sjoberg, calls Hinduism a "synthesis" in which the Dravidian elements prevail: "The Hindu synthesis was less the dialectical reduction of orthodoxy and heterodoxy than the resurgence of the ancient, aboriginal Indus civilization. In this process the rude, barbaric Aryan tribes were gradually civilised and eventually merged with the autochthonous Dravidians. Although elements of their domestic cult and ritualism were jealously preserved by Brahman priests, the body of their culture survived only in fragmentary tales and allegories embedded in vast, syncretistic compendia. On the whole, the Aryan contribution to Indian culture is insignificant. The essential pattern of Indian culture was already established in the third millennium B.C., and ... the form of Indian civilization perdured and eventually reasserted itself.); Sjoberg (1990); Flood (1996, p. 16); Vijay Nath (2001); Werner (2005, pp. 8–9); Lockard (2007, p. 50); Hiltebeitel (2007); Hopfe & Woodward (2008, p. 79) (Note: Hopfe & Woodward (2008, p. 79): "The religion that the Aryans brought with them mingled with the religion of the native people, and the culture that developed between them became classical Hinduism."); Samuel (2010))

Both religions share many beliefs and practices but also exhibit pronounced differences that have led to significant debate. Both religions share a belief in karma and rebirth (or reincarnation). They both accept the idea of spiritual liberation (moksha or nirvana) from the cycle of reincarnation and promote similar religious practices, such as dhyana, samadhi, mantra, and devotion. Both religions also share many deities (though their nature is understood differently), including Saraswati, Vishnu (Upulvan), Mahakala, Indra, Ganesha, and Brahma.

However, Buddhism notably rejects fundamental Hindu doctrines such as atman (substantial self or soul), Brahman (a universal eternal source of everything), and the existence of a creator God (Ishvara). Instead, Buddhism teaches not-self (anatman) and dependent arising as fundamental metaphysical theories.

== Origins ==
=== Buddhism ===
Historically, the roots of Buddhism lie in the religious thought of Iron Age India around the middle of the first millennium BCE. This was a period of great intellectual ferment and socio-cultural change known as the second urbanisation, marked by the growth of towns and trade, the composition of the Upanishads and the historical emergence of the Śramaṇa traditions. (Note: While some interpretations state that Buddhism may have originated as a social reform, other scholars state that it is incorrect and anachronistic to regard the Buddha as a social reformer. Buddha's concern was "to reform individuals, help them to leave society forever, not to reform the world... he never preached against social inequality". Richard Gombrich, quoted by Christopher Queen.)

New ideas developed both in the Vedic tradition in the form of the Upanishads, and outside of the Vedic tradition through the Śramaṇa movements. The term Śramaṇa refers to several Indian religious movements parallel to but separate from the historical Vedic religion, including Buddhism, Jainism and others such as Ājīvika.

Several Śramaṇa movements are known to have existed in India before the 6th century BCE (pre-Buddha, pre-Mahavira), and these influenced both the āstika and nāstika traditions of Indian philosophy. According to Martin Wiltshire, the Śramaṇa tradition evolved in India over two phases, namely Paccekabuddha and Savaka phases, the former being the tradition of individual ascetic and the latter of disciples, and that Buddhism and Jainism ultimately emerged from these. Brahmanical and non-Brahmanical ascetic groups shared and used several similar ideas, but the Śramaṇa traditions also drew upon already established Brahmanical concepts and philosophical roots, states Wiltshire, to formulate their own doctrines. Brahmanical motifs can be found in the oldest Buddhist texts, using them to introduce and explain Buddhist ideas. For example, prior to Buddhist developments, the Brahmanical tradition internalised and variously reinterpreted the three Vedic sacrificial fires as concepts such as Truth, Rite, Tranquility or Restraint. Buddhist texts also refer to the three Vedic sacrificial fires, reinterpreting and explaining them as ethical conduct.

The Śramaṇa religions challenged and broke with the Brahmanic tradition on core assumptions such as Atman (soul, self), Brahman, the nature of afterlife, and they rejected the authority of the Vedas and Upanishads. Buddhism was one among several Indian religions that did so.

=== Hinduism ===
Scholars regard Hinduism as a fusion or synthesis of various Indian cultures and traditions. Among its roots are the historical Vedic religion, itself already the product of "a composite of the Indo-Aryan and Harappan cultures and civilizations", (Note: See: White (2006, p. 28): "[T]he religion of the Vedas was already a composite of the indo-Aryan and Harappan cultures and civilizations."; Gombrich (1996, pp. 35–36): "It is important to bear in mind that the Indo-Aryans did not enter an uninhabited land. For nearly two millennia they and their culture gradually penetrated India, moving east and south from their original seat in the Punjab. They mixed with people who spoke Munda or Dravidian languages, who have left no traces of their culture beyond some archaeological remains; we know as little about them as we would about the Indo-Aryans if they had left no texts. In fact we cannot even be sure whether some of the archaeological finds belong to Indo-Aryans, autochthonous populations, or a mixture. It is to be assumed – though this is not fashionable in Indian historiography – that the clash of cultures between Indo-Aryans and autochtones was responsible for many of the changes in Indo-Aryan society. We can also assume that many – perhaps most – of the indigenous population came to be assimilated into Indo-Aryan culture.) which evolved into the Brahmanical religion and ideology of the Kuru kingdom of Iron Age northern India; but also the Śramaṇa or renouncer traditions of northeast India, and mesolithic and neolithic cultures of India, such as the religions of the Indus Valley Civilisation, Dravidian traditions, and the local traditions and tribal religions.

This Hindu synthesis emerged after the Vedic period, between 500-200 BCE and c. 300 CE, in or after the period of the second urbanisation, and during the early classical period of Hinduism, when the Epics and the first Puranas were composed. This Brahmanical synthesis incorporated śramaṇic and Buddhist influences and the emerging bhakti tradition into the Brahmanical fold via the smriti literature. This synthesis emerged under the pressure of the success of Buddhism and Jainism. During the Gupta reign the first Puranas were written, (Note: The date of the production of the written texts does not define the date of origin of the Puranas (Johnson 2009, p. 247). They may have existed in some oral form before being written down (Johnson 2009, p. 247).) which were used to disseminate "mainstream religious ideology amongst pre-literate and tribal groups undergoing acculturation." The resulting Puranic Hinduism differed markedly from the earlier Brahmanism of the Dharmasutras and the smritis. (Note: Michaels (2004, p. 38): "The legacy of the Vedic religion in Hinduism is generally overestimated. The influence of the mythology is indeed great, but the religious terminology changed considerably: all the key terms of Hinduism either do not exist in Vedic or have a completely different meaning. The religion of the Veda does not know the ethicised migration of the soul with retribution for acts (karma), the cyclical destruction of the world, or the idea of salvation during one's lifetime (jivanmukti; moksa; nirvana); the idea of the world as illusion (maya) must have gone against the grain of ancient India, and an omnipotent creator god emerges only in the late hymns of the rgveda. Nor did the Vedic religion know a caste system, the burning of widows, the ban on remarriage, images of gods and temples, Puja worship, Yoga, pilgrimages, vegetarianism, the holiness of cows, the doctrine of stages of life (asrama), or knew them only at their inception. Thus, it is justified to see a turning point between the Vedic religion and Hindu religions." See also Halbfass 1991, pp. 1–2) Hinduism co-existed for several centuries with Buddhism, with Hinduism gaining greater prominence in the 8th century through the efforts of Kumarila and Shankara. (Note: University of Oslo: "During the period following Ashoka, until the end of the 7th century AD, the great gift ceremonies honoring the Buddha remained the central cult of Indian imperial kingdoms".)

== Similarities ==
=== Terms and teachings ===
Buddhism and Hinduism share numerous terms and concepts such as: dharma, karma, samadhi, samsara, dhyana, jñana, klesha, nirodha, samskāra, brahmin, brahmacarya, and nirvana.

Numerous religious terms used by Buddha are also used in Hinduism, though he often used them in different and novel ways. Many terms which Buddhism shares with Hinduism carry a different meaning in the Buddhist tradition. For example, in the Samaññaphala Sutta, the Buddha is depicted presenting a notion of the "three knowledges" (tevijja) – a term also used in the Vedic tradition to describe knowledge of the Vedas – as being not texts, but things that he had experienced. The true "three knowledges" are said to be constituted by the process of achieving enlightenment, which is what the Buddha is said to have achieved in the three watches of the night of his enlightenment.

==== Karma, rebirth, and samsara ====
Karma is a central part of Hindu and Buddhist teachings. Karma is a word meaning action or activity and often implies its subsequent results (also called karmaphala, "the fruits of action"). Karma theory is commonly applied to the ethical realm of cause and effect in both Buddhism and Hinduism. In Buddhism and in Hinduism, a person's words, thoughts and actions form the basis for good and bad karma. Good deeds (good karmas) lead to good karmic results (Sanskrit: karma-phala, the fruits of karma) which can include the circumstances of one's future reincarnation. Likewise, evil actions might result in negative karmic consequences.

Thus, the Indian idea of karma is also closely associated with the idea of reincarnation or rebirth. One's karma in previous lives affect one's present existence, and one's actions in this life will lead to effects in the next life. Both Buddhism and Hinduism accept that living beings are constantly cycling through different bodies and realms of existence, in a repetitive process called saṃsāra (literally "the wandering").

==== Dharma ====
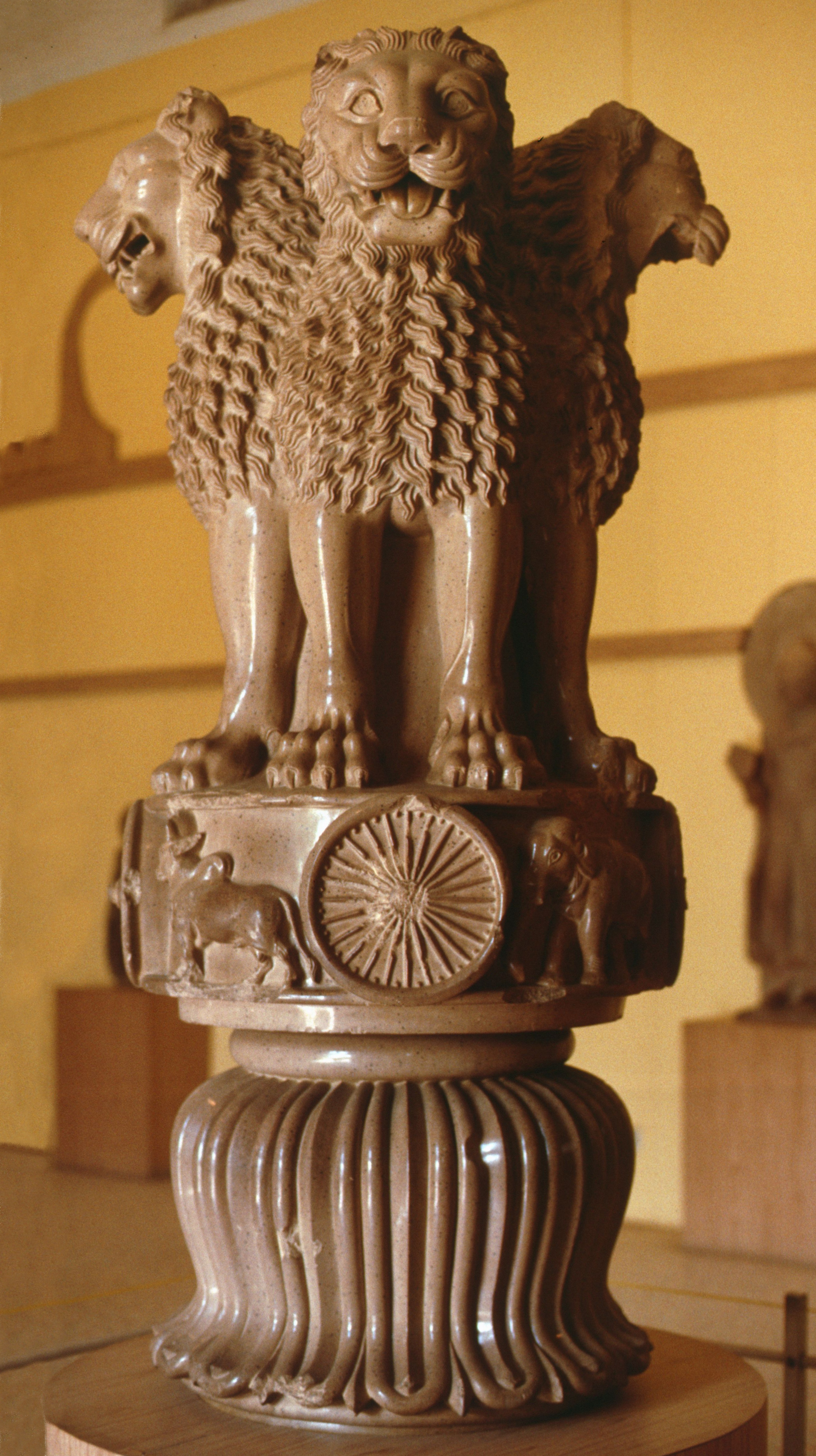
The original Lion Capital of Ashoka, from Sarnath, depicts the dharmachakra (wheel of dharma), which symbolizes the concept of Dharma in both Buddhism and Hinduism.

Dharma (Sanskrit, Devanagari: धर्म or Pāli Dhamma) is an Indic term common to all Indian religions. Dharma can mean nature, natural law, reality, teaching, religion or duty, and with respect to its significance for spirituality and religion might be considered the way of the higher truths. A Hindu appellation for Hinduism itself is Sanātana Dharma, which translates as "the eternal dharma". Similarly, Buddha Dharma is a common way that Buddhists refer to Buddhism.

In Hinduism, Dharma can refer generally to religious duty or universal order (similar to rta), and also mean social order, right conduct, or simply virtue. In Buddhism, Dharma can mean the true nature of things or the natural law that the Buddha discovered. It can also refer to the teachings of the Buddha, which explain and reveal this nature.

==== Asceticism and monasticism ====
Both Buddhism and some forms of Hinduism emphasize the importance of monasticism. In Buddhism, the monastic sangha plays a central role in teaching and passing down the Buddha's Dharma. Monasticism is also seen as an ideal way of life for cultivating the qualities that lead to awakening. In certain sects of Hinduism, the life of the renouncer (sannyasa) is also very important.

==== Cosmology and deities ====
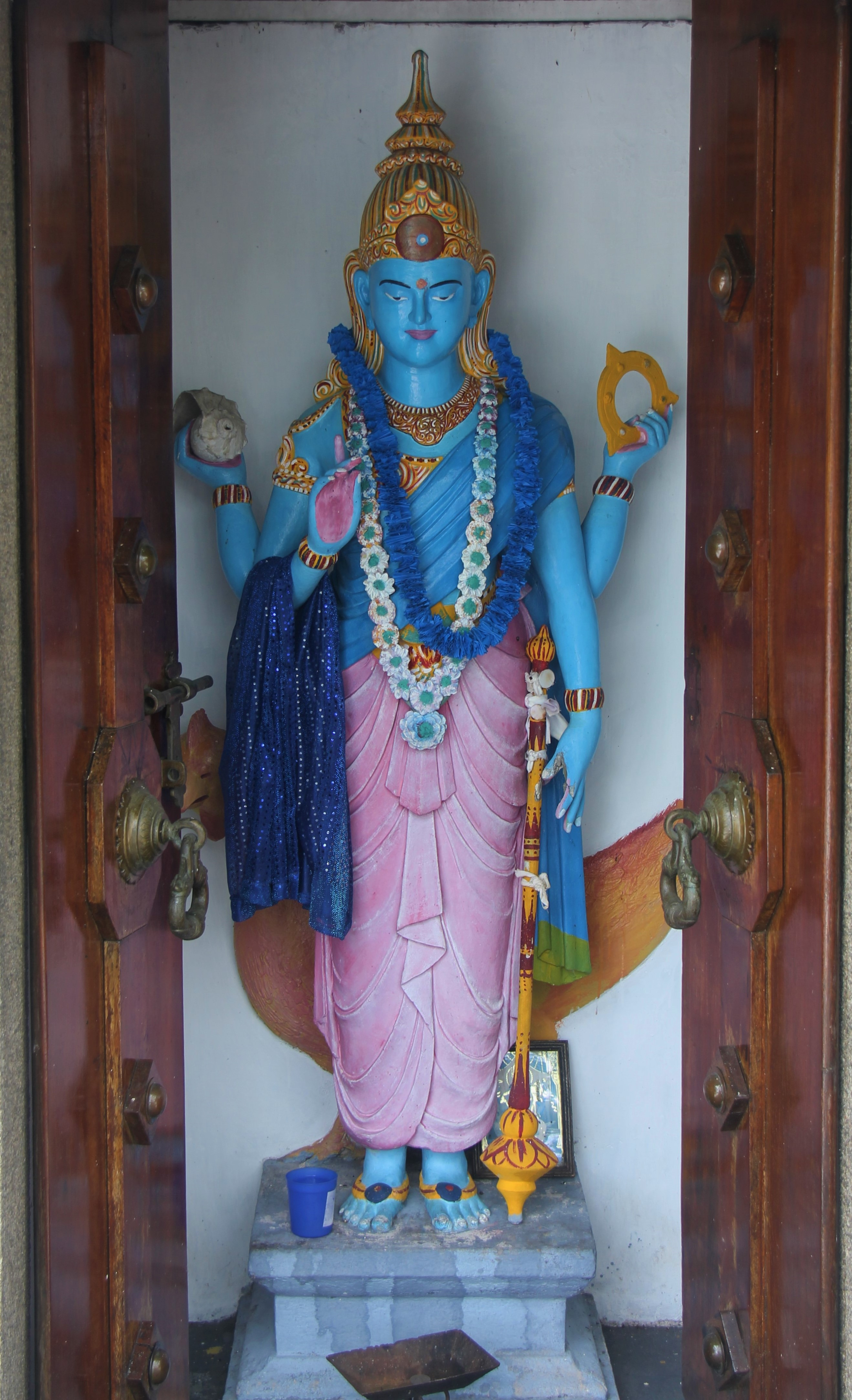
Vishnu (Upulvan) statue in Seema Malaka Buddhist temple, Colombo

Buddhist cosmology and Hindu cosmology share many similarities. Both cosmologies are cyclical and both accept that the universe goes through constant cycles of growth and destruction. Both traditions also accept that there are many different realms or worlds (lokas) other than the human realm. These include various hell realms and celestial deva realms.

Buddhism and Hinduism share some of the same deities, including:

- Saraswati (known as Benzaiten in Japan),
- Vishnu (known as Upulvan in Sri Lanka),
- Shiva (known as Maheśvara in Buddhism)
- Mahākāla (a form of Shiva in Hinduism) is seen as a form of Dharmapala in Mahayana Buddhism
- Indra, Vedic-era Hindu storm god of the Heavens, who is also widely depicted in Buddhist scriptures, see: Śakra
- Ganesh (more widely known as Ganapati in Buddhism)
- Brahma, a key deity in the old Upanishads who is also seen as a protective figure in Buddhism (called Mahabrahma) and also as a class of deities, see: Brahma in Buddhism.
- Lakshmi (in Japanese Buddhism she is known as Kishijoten)
- Tara is an important Buddhist deity in Tibetan Buddhism. In Hinduism, Tara Devi is one of the ten Mahavidyas.

The Buddhist text Mahamayuri Tantra, written during the 1–3rd centuries CE, mentions various deities (such as Maheshvara) throughout South Asia, and invokes them for the protection of the Buddhadharma. It also mentions a large number of Vedic rishis.

==== Liberation ====
Both Buddhism and Hinduism teach a similar goal of liberation or spiritual enlightenment from the cycle of rebirths (samsara). Both religions accept that the escape from the cycle of rebirths or samsara is the highest goal of the spiritual life. In both religions, this liberation is considered the complete end of rebirth or reincarnation. In Hinduism, this liberation may be called moksha, nirvana, or kaivalya; and in Buddhism it may be called vimoksha (Pali: vimokha), nirvana (Pali: nibbana) or bodhi (awakening). Both Hinduism and Buddhism use the term nirvana for spiritual liberation, which literally means 'blowing out' or 'quenching'. The term is pre-Buddhist, but its etymology is not essentially conclusive for finding out its exact meaning as the highest goal of early Buddhism.

Both religions also venerate the liberated beings who have attained the goal of spiritual liberation. Buddhism calls liberated beings either arhats or Buddhas (awakened ones). In Hinduism, liberated beings are commonly called jivanmuktas, though the term nirvana is also used. The term "Buddha" is also used in some Hindu scriptures. In the Vayu Purana for example, the sage Daksha calls Shiva a Buddha.

=== Language ===
Sanskrit, the ancient Indian language, is the liturgical language of the Vedic traditions and the primary language of the Vedas, Upanishads, and other Hindu texts.

Early Buddhist texts were written in Pali. However, Buddhism also adopted Sanskrit, especially the Mahayana and Vajrayana branches, and became more prominent as it spread across India. The transition to Sanskrit from Pali is noted through the production of Mahayana sutras, such as the Prajnaparamita Sutras and Lotus Sutra.

Sanskrit as a common language enabled Hindu and Buddhist philosophers to cross-pollinate ideas, as seen by the Upanishadic influence on early Buddhist thought.

=== Practices ===
==== Ethics ====
Both Hinduism and Buddhism promote similar ethical systems. The virtue of non-harming (ahimsa) is a key virtue in both Hindu ethics and Buddhist ethics. Other important shared ethical principles include non-attachment (vairagya), renunciation (nekkhamma), and truthfulness (satya).

==== Yogic practice, Dhyana and Samadhi ====
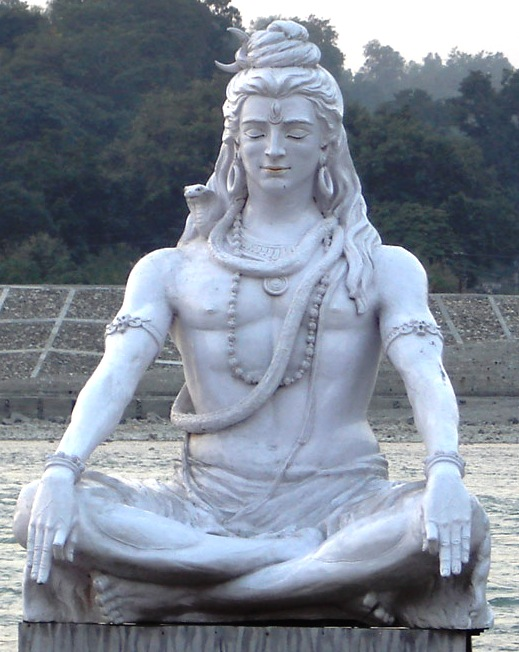
Statue of Shiva meditating at Rishikesh

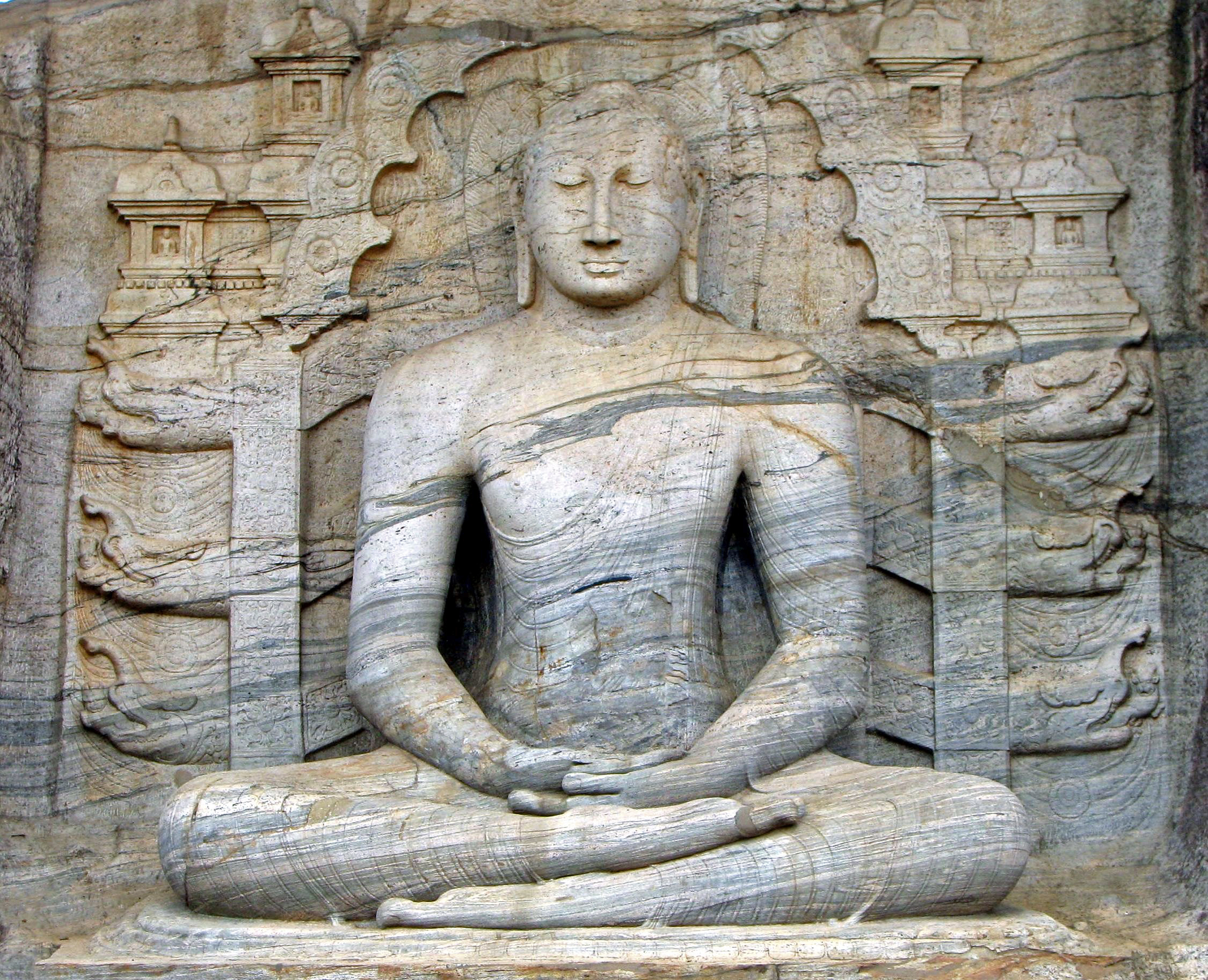
Statue of Buddha meditating at Gal Vihara

The practice of Yoga is intimately connected to the religious beliefs and practices of both Hinduism and Buddhism. There is a range of common terminology and common descriptions of the meditative states that are seen as the foundation of meditation practice in both Hindu Yoga and Buddhism. Many scholars have noted that the concepts of dhyana and samādhi - technical terms describing stages of meditative absorption – are common to meditative practices in both Hinduism and Buddhism. Most notable in this context is the relationship between the system of four Buddhist dhyana states (Pali: jhana) and the samprajnata samadhi states of Classical Yoga. Also, many (Tibetan) Vajrayana practices of the generation stage and completion stage work with the chakras, inner energy channels (nadis) and kundalini, called tummo in Tibetan.

Yoga scholar Stephen Cope argues that Buddhism and Hindu traditions like Patanjali's Yoga (a system which is very influential on modern Hinduism) are strikingly similar in numerous key ways, having shared a long period of interchange up to about 500 CE.

The following chart compares these two basic religious systems:

Aspects	Patanjalian Yoga	Buddhism
Primary problems	Dukkha (suffering) Ignorance (not seeing reality clearly)	
Liberation method 1: Cultivate skilful behaviours	Yamas (restraints), Niyamas (observances)	Sila (ethical training)
Liberation method 2: Cultivate concentrated states	Dharana (concentration), Dhyana (meditation)	Samadhi and the Four Dhyanas (meditations)
Liberation method 3: Use states to explore reality	Samyama (which leads to prajñā), self study (svadhyaya)	Study, contemplation, investigation of reality (dhammavicaya), vipassana.
View of ordinary reality	4 Erroneous Beliefs — permanence of material objects, — ultimate reality of body, — that suffering is happiness, — that body/mind is true self	3 Marks of Existence: — conditioned things are impermanent — all conditioned things are dukkha — all phenomena are not self
The end of suffering	Kaivalya (emancipation)	Nirvana
Differing view of ultimate reality	The atman (Self) i.e. purusha or pure awareness	Dependent Arising and not-self (anatman)

The Yoga Sutras of Patanjali, written some time after 100 BCE, describe eight limbs of yoga, aiming at samadhi, the stilling of the mind and the recognition of purusha as one's true identity. In the Vajrayana Buddhism of Tibet the term "Yoga" is simply used to refer to any type of spiritual practice; from the various types of tantra (like Kriyayoga or Charyayoga) to 'Deity yoga' and 'guru yoga'. In the early translation phase of the Sutrayana and Tantrayana from India, China and other regions to Tibet, along with the practice lineages of sadhana, codified in the Nyingmapa canon, the most subtle 'conveyance' (Sanskrit: yana) is Adi Yoga (Sanskrit). A contemporary scholar with a focus on Tibetan Buddhism, Robert Thurman writes that Patanjali was influenced by the success of the Buddhist monastic system to formulate his own matrix for the version of thought he considered orthodox.

==== Devotion ====
Both traditions also make use of devotional practice (bhakti). Devotion in Buddhism is mainly directed towards the Buddhas and bodhisattvas, but may also include some devas. Mindfulness of the Buddha is a widespread practice in all Buddhist traditions and includes chanting or reciting the names or mantras of Buddhas and bodhisattvas. The practice of remembering the devas (Pali: devanussati), which might include visualizing them and remembering their qualities, is taught in numerous Buddhist sutras of the Pali Canon and is part of the ten recollections.

In Hinduism, bhakti yoga is focused on God (Ishvara), whether understood as Vishnu, Shiva or Devi. This yoga includes listening to scripture, prayer, chanting, worship services (puja) and other practices.

==== Mantra ====
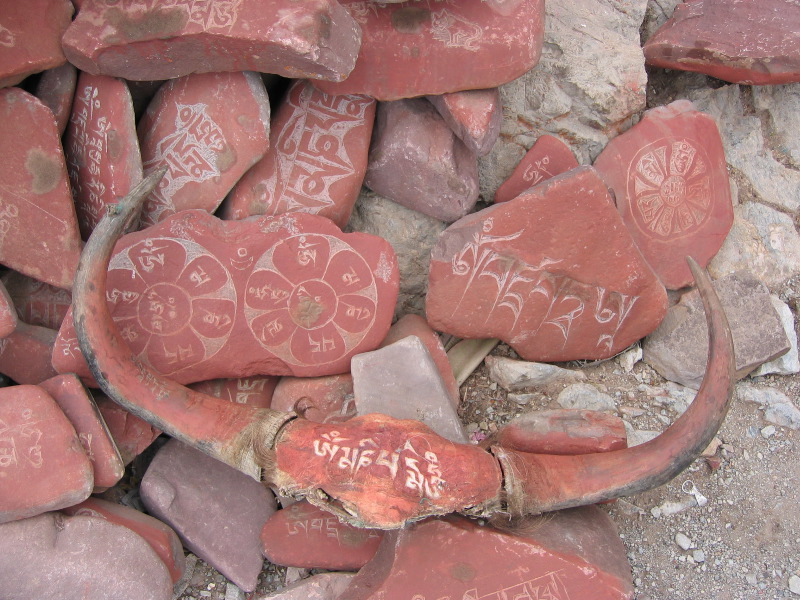
In Tibet, many Buddhists carve mantras into pebbles as a form of devotion.

A mantra is a sacred phrase or syllable, typically from the Sanskrit and Pali language. Their use varies according to the school and philosophy associated with the mantra. They are primarily used as spiritual conduits, words or vibrations that instill one-pointed concentration in the devotee. Other purposes have included religious ceremonies to accumulate wealth, avoid danger, or eliminate enemies. Mantras existed in the historical Vedic religion, Zoroastrianism and the Shramanic traditions, and thus they remain important in Buddhism and Jainism as well as other faiths of Indian origin such as Sikhism.

==== Rituals ====
Mahayana and Vajrayana Buddhist traditions in East Asia and Tibet share several common rituals with Hinduism. Some examples include the homa ritual as well as prayers and food offerings for the ancestors and deceased (which was incorporated into the Ghost Festival in East Asian Buddhist traditions).

=== Symbolism ===
- Mudras are symbolic hand-gestures in Indian art, Buddhist and Hindu deities are often depicted with specific mudras
- Dharma Wheel: The Dharma Wheel (dharmachakra), which appears on the national flag of India and the flag of the Thai royal family, is a traditional symbol that is used by members of both religions.
- Tilaka: Many Hindu devotees mark their heads with a tilaka, which is interpreted as a third eye. A similar mark, the urna, is one of the characteristic physical characteristics of the Buddha.
- Swastikas are used in both traditions. It can be either clockwise or counter-clockwise and both are seen in Hinduism and Buddhism. The Buddha is sometimes depicted with a sauwastika on his chest or the palms of his hands.
- The Lotus flower signifies divinity and purity in both traditions
- Mandalas

== Differences ==
=== Founders ===
Hinduism has no single historical founder. Modern Hinduism grew out of the interaction between diverse Indian religious groups over centuries of history. Buddhism however does have a single historical founder, Siddhartha Gautama, a Śramaṇa who became the Buddha.

=== Scriptures ===
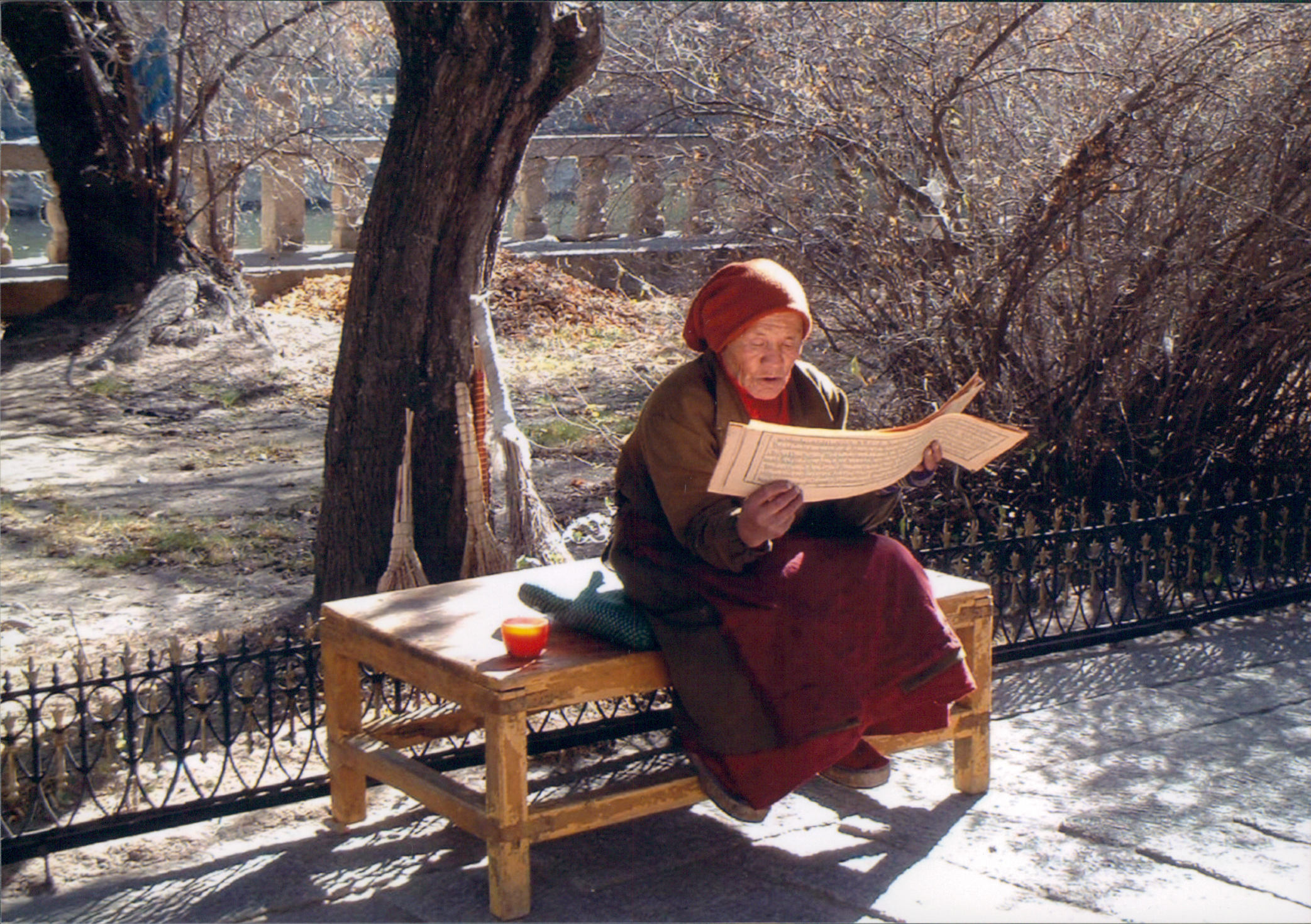
Tibetan woman reading Tibetan Buddhist scriptures

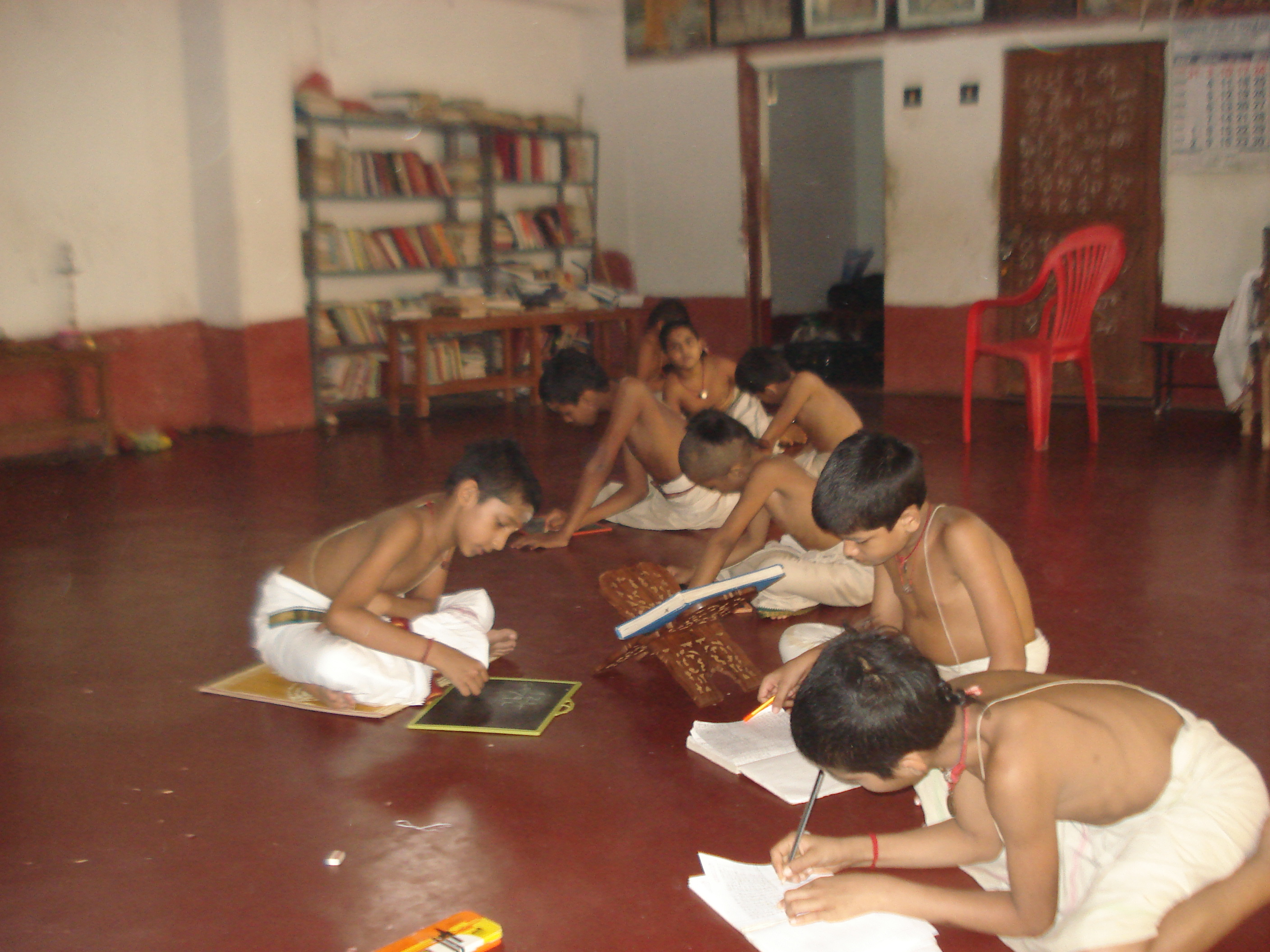
Veda Pathashala students learning the Vedas

Both traditions have their own canon of scripture and do not accept each other's scriptures as authoritative. Buddhism rejects the Vedas and other Hindu scripture as being authoritative. Instead, Buddhists generally accept the word of the Buddha (Buddhavacana) as being authoritative regarding religious matters. Buddhists also reject the idea that the Vedas are eternal divine scriptures (either as uncreated or as created by a God), which are common Hindu beliefs defended in the Vedanta and Mimamsa philosophies. As such, the Buddhist tradition ignores the very foundation of Hindu brahmanical religion (sruti: authoritative scriptures).

==== Buddhist perspective ====
The Buddha is recorded as having criticized the Vedic Brahmanical religion in the Canki Sutta (Majjhima Nikaya no. 95) as a lineage which blindly passes on scriptures without having true knowledge of things:

Suppose there were a file of blind men each in touch with the next: the first one does not see, the middle one does not see, and the last one does not see. So too, Bhāradvāja, in regard to their statement the brahmins seem to be like a file of blind men: the first one does not see, the middle one does not see, and the last one does not see. What do you think, Bhāradvāja, that being so, does not the faith of the brahmins turn out to be groundless?

The Indian Buddhist philosopher Dharmakīrti pithily expressed his disagreement with the religion of the Vedas as follows:

Accepting the authority of the Vedas, believing in individual agency, hoping for merit from bathing, taking pride in caste, undertaking rites for the removal of evils: these are the five signs of stupidity, the destruction of intelligence.

Later Buddhist authors like Bhavaviveka and Saṅghabhadra argued that the Vedas were authored by ancient people who were spiritually and philosophically unqualified as well as being morally deficient. In his critique, Bhavaviveka actually draws on some passages found in the Hindu Samkhyakarika and in the work of Gaudapada, which holds that Vedic sacrifice is impure and of “mixed nature” (Sanskrit: miśrībhāva). Bhavaviveka points to the presence of killing (found in various sacrifices), sexual promiscuity (in a Vedic ritual called Gosava) and use of alcohol (in a rite called Sautrāmaṇī) in the Vedas to argue that they were authored by evil people and compares them to the foreign scriptures of the "Magas" (i.e. the Persian Magi). Furthermore, in the ninth chapter of his Madhyamakahrdayakārikā (Verses on the Heart of the Middle Way), Bhavaviveka critiques the idea that bad karma can be removed through Vedic ritual, through devotion (bhakti) to the gods or by meditating on the gods and their mantras.

==== Hindu perspective ====
Meanwhile, most Hindus see the Vedas as divinely revealed scriptures. Hindu traditions either believe that the Vedas are authorless and eternal, or they hold that the Vedas were created by Ishvara (the supreme God). Many Hindus also hold the Vedas to be a key scriptural authority (Śāstra pramāṇam). In Hinduism, religious philosophies are often classified either as astika (orthodox) or nastika (unorthodox), that is, philosophies that either affirm or reject the authorities of the Vedas. According to this tradition, Buddhism is a nastika school.

Due to the Buddhist rejection of the Vedas (and the Vedic varṇāśrama - 'job and life stage' teaching), many Hindu sources see Buddhists as heretics (pāṣaṇḍa/pākhaṇḍa) and a sign of the Dark Age, the Kali Yuga. For example, the Bhāgavata Purāṇa, an extremely influential Hindu Puranic source, considers Buddhists (as well Jains) to be "pāṣaṇḍas" (heretics, impostors).

Likewise, as noted by Klaus K. Klostermaier, the Viṣṇu Purāṇa, an ancient and authoritative Purana, "presents the Buddha as a heretic and a seducer of people, one of many forms of the māyā-moha (delusive power) of Viṣṇu and recommends complete shunning of Buddhists in order to prevent pollution and punishment."

=== Epistemology ===
Since the time of Shakyamuni Buddha, Buddhist philosophy has generally focused on what can be perceived and empirically known. Buddhist thinkers, including Shakyamuni, and later philosophers like Dharmakīrti, based their theories on what was known through ordinary sense experience, as well as through extrasensory perception enabled by high degrees of mental concentration. Buddhist thinkers like Dharmakīrti (fl. c. 6th or 7th century) thus only accept two epistemological sources (pramāṇa): perception and inference. Buddhist scriptures are thus seen as secondary sources of knowledge which can guide one on difficult and inaccessible topics (such as karma, soteriology, etc.). According to Buddhist thinkers like Dharmakīrti however, scripture is a fallible source of knowledge and thus uncertain.

Hindu philosophical traditions like Nyaya and Vedanta meanwhile generally accept Vedic scriptures as a major source of knowledge. Indeed, in Vedanta, the Vedic sources are the main source of knowledge. Vedāntins thinkers all agree that Vedic scripture (śruti) is the only means of knowledge (pramāṇa) when it comes to spiritual topics. For example, the Vedāntin Rāmānuja states that "with regard to supernatural matters, Scripture alone is the epistemic authority and that reasoning is to be used only in support of Scripture’" (Śrī Bhāṣya 2.1.12).

Thus, classical Hindu thinkers only accepted reasoning and logic (hetu) if it did not contradict the Vedas. As The Laws of Manu states: “If a twice-born disparages [scripture and tradition] by relying on the science of logic (hetuśāstra), he ought to be ostracized by good people as an infidel and a denigrator of the Veda.” Likewise, Hindu philosopher Bhartṛhari writes: “logical reasoning, when not inconsistent with the vedic treatise, is the eye of those who cannot see.”

=== Metaphysics ===
==== Karma ====
According to Richard Gombrich, Karma in Buddhism carries a significantly different meaning than pre-Buddhist conceptions of karma. For Buddhists, karma is mainly a mental process which is founded on an individual's intention (cetanā). The Buddha equated karma with the psychological impulse or intent behind the action (whether that action is bodily, verbal or mental). Thus, in Buddhism, one's intention has an ethical force that can affect one in the future (in this life or the next).

Meanwhile, according to the most influential school of Hindu philosophy, the Vedanta school, the effects of karma (karma-phala, i.e. the "fruits" of karma) are controlled by God (Isvara). Vedanta argues that without God, one cannot account for the workings of karma.

==== Ātman ====
Ātman is a Sanskrit word that literally means 'breath', as the German word 'atmen'. It points to the living essence of man, and is often translated as 'self'. For the Upanishads and for much of Hindu philosophy, knowledge of the ātman is seen as essential to attain liberation. A major departure from Hindu and Jain philosophy is the Buddhist rejection of a permanent, self-existent ātman in favour of the theory of not-self (anātman).

In Hindu philosophy, especially in the Vedanta school, ātman is the first principle, the true self of an individual beyond identification with phenomena, the true essence or being of an individual. In the Bṛhadāraṇyaka Upaniṣad, Yajñavalkya (c. 9th century BCE) uses the word to indicate that in which everything exists, which is of the highest value, which permeates everything, which is the essence of all, bliss and beyond description. Older Upanishads such as the Bṛhadāraṇyaka also often describe the self in an apophatic fashion, as in the expression neti neti (not this, not this). Post Buddhist Upanishads, like the Maitri Upanishad, define Ātman as only the defiled individual self, rather than the universal self (i.e. Brahman). The Taittiriya Upanishad further defines Ātman or the self as consisting of five sheaths (koshas: bodily, prana, mind, intellect, and bliss sheath). However, there are exceptions to all of these passages which completely affirm the Self. As buddhologist Joseph Walser notes, the Maitri Upanishad and other texts in the Black Yajurveda make use of the term nirātman (which is linguistically synonymous with the Buddhist term anātman) to refer to a certain yogic state.

Furthermore, different Hindu texts and philosophical traditions describe the Self in various different (often conflicting) ways. Thus, Advaita Vedanta (non-dualism) sees the ātman within each living entity as being fully identical with the universal consciousness - Brahman, whereas other schools such as Dvaita (dualism) and Shaiva Siddhanta differentiate between the individual selves in living beings, and the Supreme atma (Paramatma) as being different beings.

In many Buddhist sources the concept of ātman is rejected and critiqued in various ways. In its place, one finds terms like anātman (not-self) and shunyata (emptiness) which are widely accepted throughout Buddhism. In the early Buddhist texts, one finds the Buddha criticizing many theories of a self or ātman as unskillful and based on ignorance (avijja). In fact, according to the Buddha's statement in Khandha Samyutta no. 47, all thoughts about self are necessarily, whether the thinker is aware of it or not, thoughts about the five aggregates or one of them. As such, all these wrong views lead to suffering, since the aggregates are suffering (dukkha), and furthermore, any sense of craving for a permanent existence leads to rebirth in samsara.

Despite the rejection of ātman theories by most Buddhists, there are some similarities between certain concepts in Buddhism and the ātman doctrine. The Upanishadic "self" shares certain characteristics with nibbana; both are described as permanent or stable (dhruva), as blissful, totally beyond suffering, and as unconditioned. Furthermore, as Joseph Walser has discovered, there are very few Pali suttas in which Buddhists confront or debate with brahmins regarding the topic of not-self (and most are about one character: Vacchagotta). Walser argues this indicates that early Buddhist teachers avoided the topic of not-self when teaching Buddhism to brahmins. Thus, it is only later Buddhist philosophers, like Vasubandhu, who directly name Hindu philosophical systems (as well as one Buddhist school, Pudgalavada) as incompatible with true Buddhism due to the not-self doctrine.

There is another important exception to the Buddhist rejection of ātman theory. This is the fact that there are certain Mahayana buddha-nature scriptures, such as the Mahāyāna Mahāparinirvāṇa Sūtra, which affirm a buddhist ātman theory and equate this Buddhist "ātman" or mahātman ("great self") with the doctrine of buddha-nature. As such, modern scholars like Jones argue that these scriptures were self consciously attempting to develop a Buddhist version of ātmavāda theory (“discourse about the self”) as well as trying to adapt the doctrine of not-self (anātman). However, these scriptures also make it clear that their doctrine of self is different from Hindu theories, and they also state that this ātman doctrine is a skillful means that can only be understood by also understanding not-self.

These differences were a key point of debate among Buddhist and Hindu thinkers throughout the history of Indian philosophy. The Hindu Vedanta philosopher Adi Śaṅkara (8th century) penned refutations of the Buddhist arguments against Ātman. Vedanta defenses of the Ātman were in turn countered by Buddhist thinkers like Śāntarakṣita (8th century), who wrote the Tattvasaṃgraha (Compendium on Reality) and his student Kamalaśīla who wrote a commentary entitled Tattvasaṃgraha-pañjikā.

==== Brahman, the cosmic Self ====
In Hindu thought, Brahman is a central concept, not so in Buddhism. Hinduism sees Brahman as the Ultimate Reality, which is an immaterial, conscious, all-pervasive and eternal creative cause of all things. In the Upanishads, Brhaman is often described as unchanging Sat-cit-ānanda (truth-consciousness-bliss). In early Upanishads like the Bṛhadāraṇyaka, Brahman is the Absolute, the eternal ultimate reality, a non-dual cosmic consciousness which is called "the imperishable". Hindu sources, including the Upanishads, often equate or link Brahman with the self (ātman). This connection is explained in different ways by the different schools of Hindu philosophy and theology. The most basic presupposition of early Brahminic cosmology is the identification of self and the cosmos (instances of this occur at TU II.1 and Mbh XII.195), and liberation for the yogin was thought to only occur at death, with the adept's union with brahman (as at Mbh XII.192.22). In some of the later philosophical traditions, Brahman is a personal God, while in others, it is the impersonal absolute consciousness, a cosmic Self.

In Buddhism meanwhile, the various Hindu theories of Brahman or any ultimate which is "permanent", "always existent" or an "independent existent", are rejected as wrong views. Though the Pāli scriptures do not use the neuter term "Brahman", some sources like the Tevijja sutta (which discusses "union with Brahmā") do discuss Brahminical theories which match the concept.

In the Alagaddupama Sutta (M I 135–136), the Buddha denies the existence of the cosmic self, as conceived in the Upanishadic tradition through the famous phrase "thou art that" (tat tvam asi). The sutta clearly denies that there is an individual or "internal" self which is the same as the entire world or an "external" self, and that one will become the world soul at death. A similar rejection of "internal" self and "external" self occurs at AN II 212. According to Gombrich, both texts are referring to the Upanishadic atman-brahman theories. The Buddha's rejection of these theories is therefore one instance of the Buddha's attack on the whole enterprise of Upanishadic ontology.

=== Theology ===
Buddhism does not accept the Hindu theory of a creator deity (Ishvara). While Buddhism inherited some practices and ideas from the previous Indian yogic traditions, its understanding is different from that of Hindu teachings (such as those found in the Bhagavad Gita). This is because, in Buddhism, Nirvana is not attained through bhakti (devotion) to God nor is it attained through a yogic unity with Brahman/God.

In the early Buddhist texts, the Buddha does not provide specific arguments against the existence of God, instead he focuses on the ethical issues that arise from this belief. The Buddha mostly ignored the idea of a God as being irrelevant to his teachings. However, he addresses the idea in a few passages. According to Narada Thera, the Buddha saw the idea of a creator God as problematic and as possibly leading to a kind of fatalism or ethical nihilism that leaves all ethical concerns to a God. In another passage, the Buddha argues that if a Supreme creator exists, the suffering experienced by certain beings would mean that this creator is evil.

The Buddha did not deny the existence of the gods (devas) of the Vedic pantheon, but rather argued that these devas, who may be in a more exalted state than humans, are still nevertheless trapped in the same cycle of suffering as other beings and are not necessarily worthy of veneration and worship. According to Buddhism, the Hindu gods like Brahma and Indra do exist. However, these gods are considered to be mortal (even though they have very long lives) and thus as being subject to rebirth. Buddhist cosmology recognizes various levels and types of devas and of other Buddhist deities, but none of these gods is considered the creator of the world or of the human race.

Later Buddhist philosophers such as Nagarjuna, Vasubandhu, and Xuanzang did write more extensive critiques of the Hindu idea of God.

Vajrayana Buddhism contains the idea of the Adi-Buddha ("First Buddha"), which some have compared to God concepts from Vedanta. However, modern Tibetan Buddhist masters like the Dalai Lama and Namkhai Norbu have written that this Adi-Buddha concept is not a God but a symbol for the Dharmakaya or "basis" (ghzi) in Dzogchen thought.

=== Society and castes ===
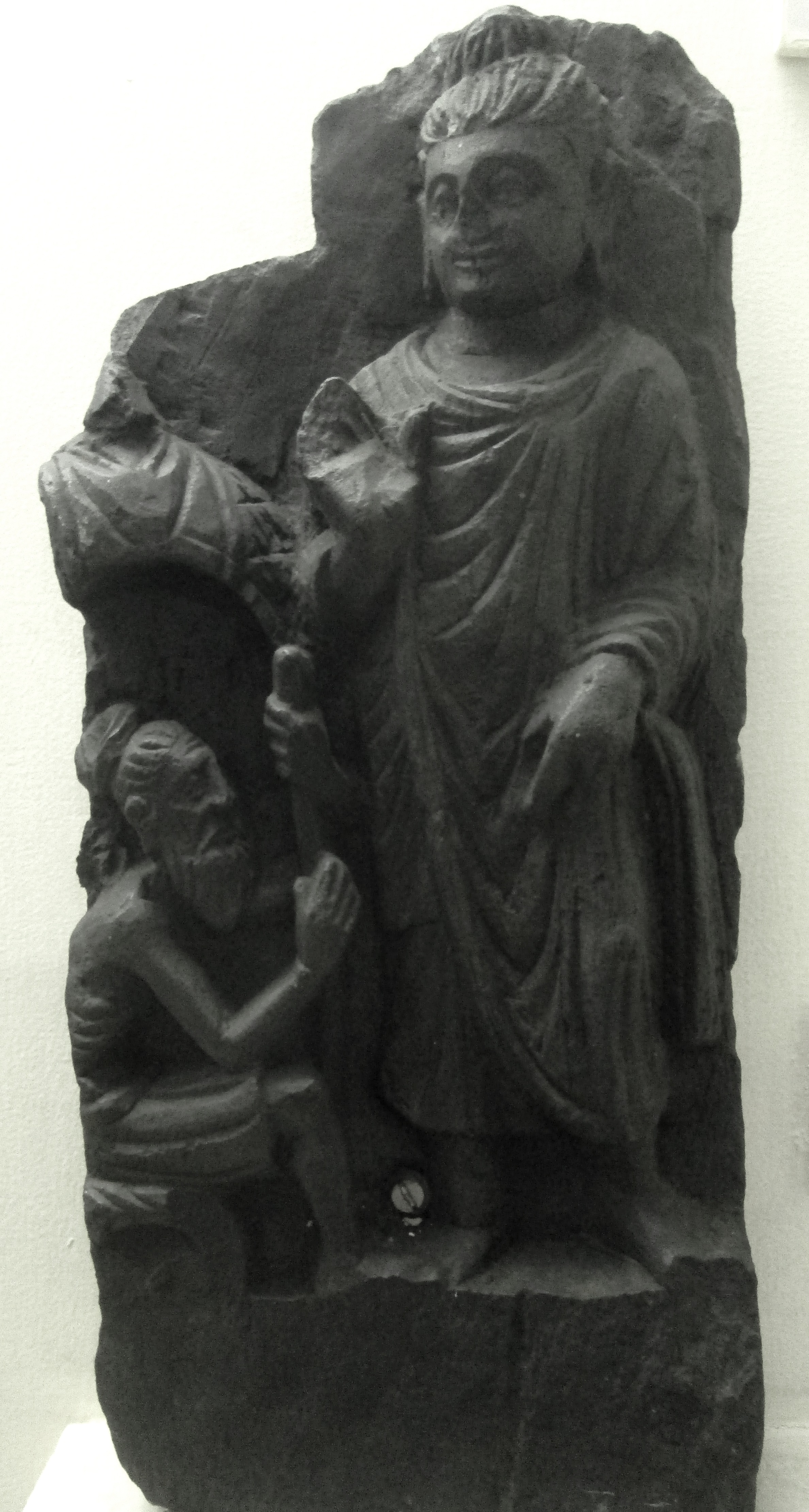
The Buddha meets a Brahmin, Indian Museum, Kolkata

In the early Buddhist texts, the Buddha critiques the Brahmanical religion and social system on certain key points. For example, the Buddha disagreed with the divine basis for caste (jāti) distinctions made in the Brahmanical religion, and he offered ordination to all regardless of caste (whereas in Brahmanism, only those born to brahmins can be priests and study the religious scriptures). In regards to the social system (varna), although the Buddha did not try to dismantle this system, he spoke out against Brahmin supremacism and the notion of any varna being superior or inferior to another. Thus, the Buddha also critiqued the idea that brahmins were somehow superior or inherently pure due to their bloodline. The Vasetthasutta argues that the main difference among humans are their actions and occupations, not their bloodline.

Furthermore, the Buddha holds that there is one universal moral law (Dharma) that is valid for everybody. Thus, Buddhism rejects the idea of caste duty (svadharma), the idea that every person is assigned a fixed duty or law based on the caste they are born into. Furthermore, for Buddhists, violence was wrong for all, whether one was part of the warrior caste or not.

While the caste system constitutes an assumed background to the stories told in Buddhist scriptures, they do not agree with the Vedic justification for this system. According to the Aggañña Sutta, all social classes or varnas arose naturally through sociological factors, they were not divinely ordained. As Bronkhorst writes, this sutra rejects the view that the Brahmin caste was born from the mouth of God and thus are special. Instead, it states that this class of people developed because people in the past meditated and compiled scriptures.

In the Aggañña Sutta, Buddha also argues that good and bad deeds are found in all castes and that moral purity comes from one's own actions, not one's birth. Because of this, all castes including untouchables were welcome in the Buddhist order and when someone joined, they renounced all caste affiliation.

==== The meaning of brahmin ====
The Buddha defined the word "brahmin" as referring to a spiritually liberated person. This replaced a distinction based on birth with one based on spiritual attainment. The Buddha explains his use of the word brahmin in many places. In the Sutta Nipata (1.7, Vasala Sutta, verse 12), the Buddha states: "not by birth is one an outcast; not by birth is one a brahmin. By deed one becomes an outcast, by deed one becomes a brahmin."

An entire chapter of the Dhammapada is devoted to showing how a true brahmin in the Buddha's use of the word is one who is of totally pure mind, namely, an arahant. Similarly, early Buddhist scriptures define purity as determined by one's state of mind, and refer to anyone who behaves unethically, of whatever caste, as "rotting within", or "a rubbish heap of impurity". A defining feature of the Buddha's teachings is self-sufficiency, so much so as to render the brahminical priesthood entirely redundant, since no mediation between oneself and the devas are needed in Buddhism.

==== The status of brahmins in Buddhism ====
While the Buddha disagreed with these brahminical ideologies, he was not anti-brahmin nor was he hostile to brahminical religion in its entirety. The early Buddhist texts often depict the Buddha cordially interacting with and teaching brahmins. These sources often state that the Buddha's path is the true fulfillment of the path the brahmins seek and the true meaning of the Vedas. One example is the Brāhmaṇadhammika Sutta, in which the Buddha praises the religion of the ancient brahmin sages, though he also states that no brahmins in his time practice "the Brahmin Dharma of the brahmins of old". According to this sutta, brahmins of old begged for their food, did not own land, and practiced non-violent sacrifices.

Many brahmins entered the sangha and became disciples of the Buddha. Indeed, many of his key disciples were brahmins, including Sariputta, Mahakassapa, Mahakaccana, and Moggallana. This trend continued into the medieval period. Later Buddhist authors like Asvaghosa, Matrceta, Asanga, Vasubandhu, and Candragomin also came from brahmin families. Some early sources even praise brahmins as believers in karma and practitioners of asceticism. Furthermore, Walser's analysis of the Pali sources shows that most brahmin Buddhist monks were taught teachings which mostly avoided the not-self doctrine and instead focused on samadhi. According to Walser, this indicates that there was a special place for brahmin monks within the sangha and that there might have been Buddhist brahmin monks living independently in brahmin villages. He notes that such a "buddhist brahmin" appears in the later Harshacarita. He further argues that "in the sutras favoring Brahmins that appear interested in having Brahmins contribute to Buddhism as Brahmins, there is little evidence for any kind of solid boundary between Buddhism and Brahmanism". Rather, it seems that more exclusivist distinctions between Vedic religion and Buddhism appeared in the works of later thinkers.

=== Religious practices ===
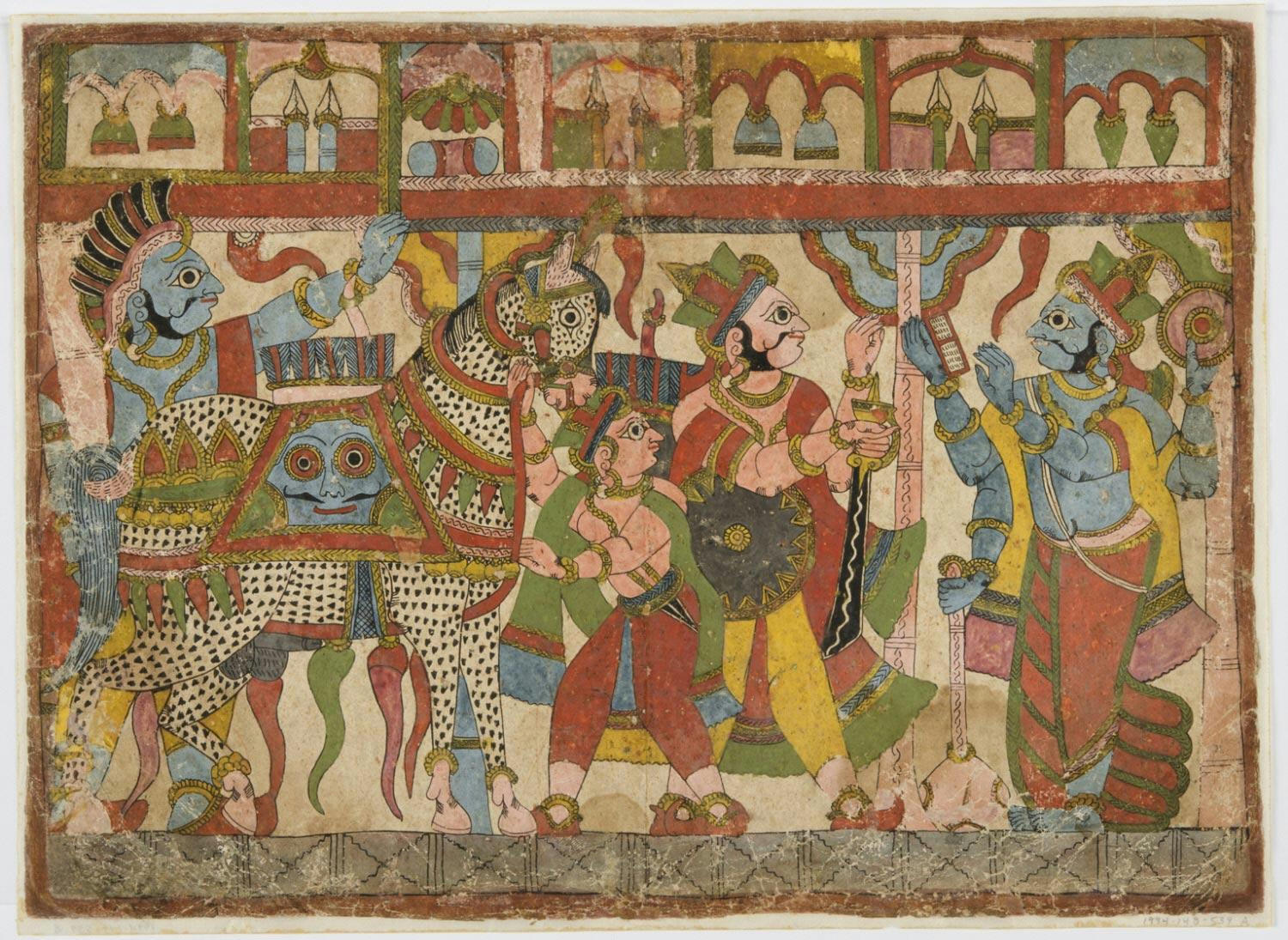
An illustration of an episode from the Mahabharata in which Krishna gives advice on the Vedic horse sacrifice to the Pandavas.

Early Buddhist texts are often critical of prevailing religious practices and social institutions. Therefore, the Buddhist tradition has always rejected the view that certain Vedic rituals are efficacious or good. It especially rejects animal sacrifice which is taught in the Vedas (such as the Vedic Horse Sacrifice).

However, the Buddha did not reject all sacrifices. In the Aṅguttara Nikāya the Buddha states: “I do not praise all sacrifice, nor do I withhold praise from all sacrifice."

In the Sutta Pitaka, the Buddha critiques certain Vedic sacrifices while praising non-violent action as follows:

The horse sacrifice, human sacrifice, sammāpāsa, vājapeyya, niraggaḷa: the grand sacrifices, fraught with violence, do not bring great fruit. The great seers of right conduct do not attend sacrifice where goats, rams, cattle, and various creatures are slain. But when they regularly offer by family custom, sacrifices free from violence, no goats, sheep and cattle, and various creatures are slain. That sacrifice of the great seers of right conduct attend. The wise person should offer this; this sacrifice is very fruitful. For one who makes such sacrifice, it is indeed better, never worse. Such a sacrifice is truly vast and deities too are pleased.

Animal sacrifice in Hinduism is still practiced in some minority sects of Hinduism.

The Buddha also rejected other Vedic practices and rituals, such as ritual bathing in rivers. In the Vatthasutta (MN 7), the Buddha states that bathing in rivers "can't cleanse a cruel and criminal person from their bad deeds."

The Samaññaphala Sutta is another early Buddhist text which addresses and critiques numerous practices that were performed by brahmin priests or other Indian contemplatives at the time of the Buddha. Some of these practices include owning luxurious furniture and furnishings, wearing scents, cosmetics, jewelry and extensive decorations, talking about kings, armies, matters of state and gossiping. The text also rejects numerous ways of making a living that the Buddha held was not proper for a true ascetic such as: fortunetelling and forecasting the future, predicting eclipses, predicting the weather or disease, accounting, composing poetry, calculating auspicious dates, collecting debts, using spells against people, worshiping the sun, acting as an oracle, demonology, protection spells, fertility spells, ceremonial bathing, offering sacrificial fires, and administering various medicines and surgery.

However, some of these practices which were commonly done by brahmins were eventually adopted by some Buddhists, giving rise to practices like Buddhist medicine, Buddhist magic, Buddhist poetry, Tibetan medicine, Tibetan astrology, weather-making and so on. Similarly, fire sacrifices (homa) were adopted by Vajrayana Buddhism in scriptures like the Mahavairocana sutra.

=== Meditation ===
Meditation was an aspect of the practice of sramana yogis in the centuries preceding the Buddha. The Buddha built upon these ideas and developed new ideas regarding meditation and how it leads to liberation. Perhaps one original idea developed by the Buddha was that meditation and ethics also needed to be coupled with a "religious insight" (prajñā).

Early Buddhist texts are probably the earliest describing meditation states and methods. Early Buddhist texts also describe meditative practices and states that existed before the Buddha, as well as those first developed within Buddhism. A common set of four meditative states called jhanas (dhyanas) are widely discussed in Buddhist sutras. These states of meditative absorption and deep focus are seen as the key defining elements in Buddhist "right samadhi" (samma samdhi), the last part of the noble eightfold path.

The first usage of the term samadhi is found in early Buddhist texts. Later Hindu texts like the Yoga sutras also use the term samadhi to mean a deeply focused state of mind. However, they also understand this as leading to knowledge of the self or purusha, while Buddhists see samadhi as leading to insight into impermanence and not-self instead.

While there is no convincing evidence for meditation in pre-Buddhist early Brahminic texts, Wynne argues that formless meditation originated in the Brahminic or Shramanic tradition, based on strong parallels between Upanishadic cosmological statements and the meditative goals of the two teachers of the Buddha as recorded in the early Buddhist texts. He mentions less likely possibilities as well. Having argued that the cosmological statements in the Upanishads also reflect a contemplative tradition, he argues that the Nasadiya Sukta contains evidence for a contemplative tradition, even as early as the late Rg Vedic period.

Two Upanishads written after the rise of Buddhism also contain full-fledged descriptions of yoga as a means to liberation.

=== Spiritual liberation ===
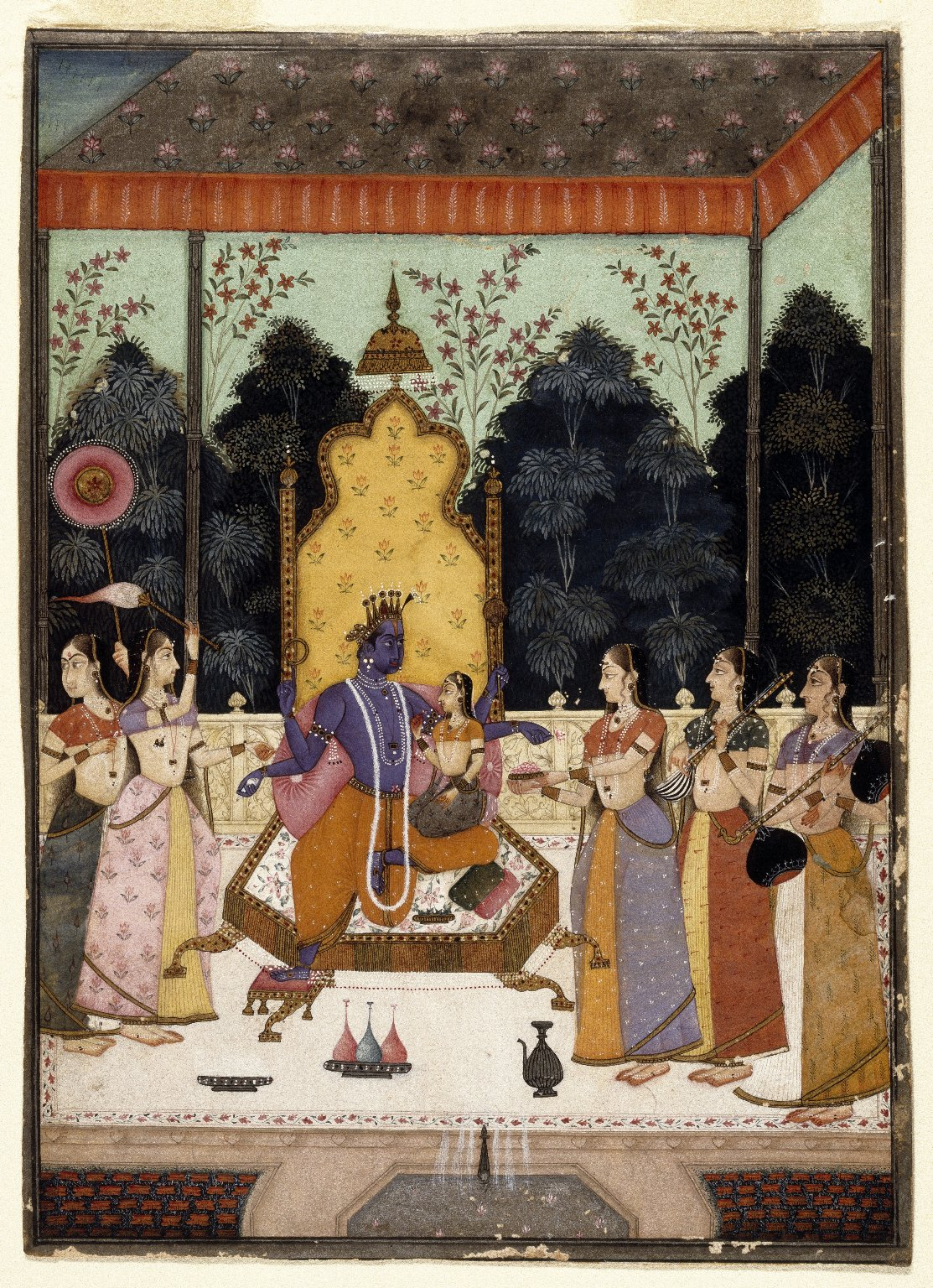
A painting of Vishnu and Lakshmi surrounded by devotees in the eternal abode of Vaikuntha, the highest spiritual goal in most schools of Vaishnavism

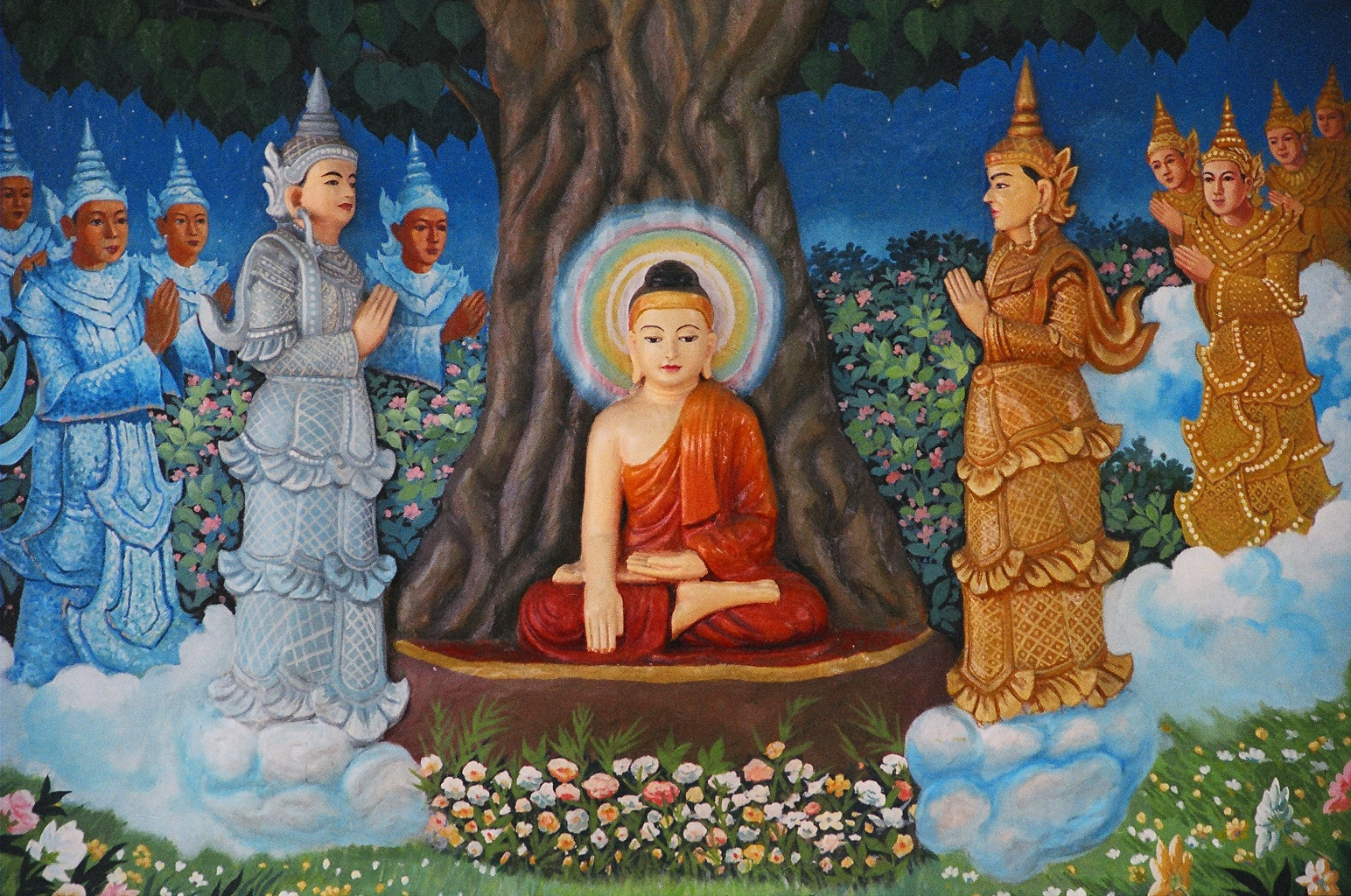
A Burmese depiction of the Buddha attaining awakening (bodhi).

Hindu theories of liberation are focused on a substantial unchanging self (atman) or on unity with God (Ishvara), while Buddhist rejects both an unchanging self and a God, arguing that even consciousness (vijñana) is in flux. In Hinduism, the ultimate goal is to realize the Self as the highest reality (Brahman or Ishvara) or to serve God in his eternal realm (such as Vishnu's Vaikuntha or Krishna's Goloka). In the Buddha's system by contrast, one must train the mind in meditation (dhyana) and gain insight (vipasyana) into the four noble truths and dependent arising. This can eventually lead to nirvana, the complete end of suffering.

Liberation for the Brahminic yogin was thought to be the permanent realization at death of a nondual universal consciousness (brahman) which is seen as blissful (ananda) and eternal (anantam). The Buddha rejected this view. Yet he was still influenced by Indian ideas of liberation and thus he adopted and gave new meaning to Vedic metaphors for liberation (like nirvana, "becoming cool", "going out").

The Buddha taught that brahmanical states of oneness do not offer a decisive and permanent end to suffering either during life or after death and he also argued against the metaphysical theories that were at their foundation. These theories were based on the Upanishadic idea that was a unity between the personal atman and the universal brahman. The Buddha, in contrast, argued that states of consciousness are caused and conditioned by a yogi's mental states and meditative techniques. Thus, for the Buddha, none of these conditioned states of yogic consciousness could be an eternal Self.

==== Nonduality ====
Both the Buddha's conception of the liberated person and the goal of early Brahminic yoga can be characterized as non-dual, but in different ways. The nondual goal in early Brahminism was conceived in ontological terms; the goal was that into which one merges after death. According to Wynne, liberation for the Buddha "... is nondual in another, more radical, sense. This is made clear in the dialogue with Upasiva, where the liberated sage is defined as someone who has passed beyond conceptual dualities. Concepts that might have some meaning in ordinary discourse, such as consciousness or the lack of it, existence and non-existence, etc., do not apply to the sage. For the Buddha, propositions are not applicable to the liberated person, because language and concepts (Sn 1076: vaadapathaa, dhammaa), as well as any sort of intellectual reckoning (sankhaa) do not apply to the liberated sage.

=== Conversion ===
Since the Hindu scriptures are essentially silent on the issue of religious conversion, the issue of whether Hindus proselytize is open to interpretations. The Supreme Court of India has taken the view that Hinduism is primarily a philosophy, a set of beliefs, or a way of life, holding that the question of whether a person is a Hindu should be determined by the person's belief system, not by their ethnic or racial heritage.

Buddhism spread throughout Asia via proselytism and conversion. Buddhist scriptures depict such conversions in the form of lay followers declaring their support for the Buddha and his teachings, or via ordination as a Buddhist monk. Buddhist identity has been broadly defined as one who "takes Refuge" in the Three Jewels: Buddha, Dharma, and Sangha, echoing a formula seen in Buddhist texts. In some communities, formal conversion rituals are observed. No specific ethnicity has typically been associated with Buddhism, and as it spread beyond its origin in India immigrant monastics were replaced with newly ordained members of the local ethnic or tribal group.

== Interactions ==
Hinduism and Buddhism have engaged in inter-religious exchange and dialogue for over two thousand years.

=== Influence of Vedic religion on early Buddhism ===
Early Buddhist scriptures do not mention schools of learning directly connected with the Upanishads. Though the earliest Upanishads had been completed by the Buddha's time, they are not cited in the early Buddhist texts as Upanishads or Vedanta. For the early Buddhists they were likely not thought of as having any outstanding significance in and of themselves, and as simply one section of the Vedas.

Certain Buddhist teachings appear to have been formulated in response to ideas presented in the early Upanishads — some cases concurring with them, and in other cases criticizing or re-interpreting them.

The influence of Upanishads, the earliest philosophical texts of Hindus, on Buddhism has been a subject of debate among scholars. While Radhakrishnan, Oldenberg and Neumann were convinced of Upanishadic influence on the Buddhist canon, Eliot and Thomas highlighted the points where Buddhism was opposed to Upanishads.

Buddhism may have been influenced by some Upanishadic ideas, it however discarded their orthodox tendencies. In Buddhist texts, the Buddha is presented as rejecting Upanishadic avenues to salvation as "pernicious views". Later schools of Indian religious thought were influenced by this interpretation and novel ideas of the Buddhist tradition of beliefs.

According to early Buddhist scriptures, the Buddha learned the two formless attainments from two teachers, Alara Kalama and Uddaka Ramaputta respectively, prior to his enlightenment. It is most likely that they belonged to the Brahmanical tradition. However, he realized that the states that they taught did not lead to awakening and thus he left their communities.

Furthermore, the early Buddhist texts mention ideas similar to those expounded in the early Upanishads, before controverting them and using them in different ways.

=== Religious borrowing and appropriation ===
==== Buddha in Hinduism ====
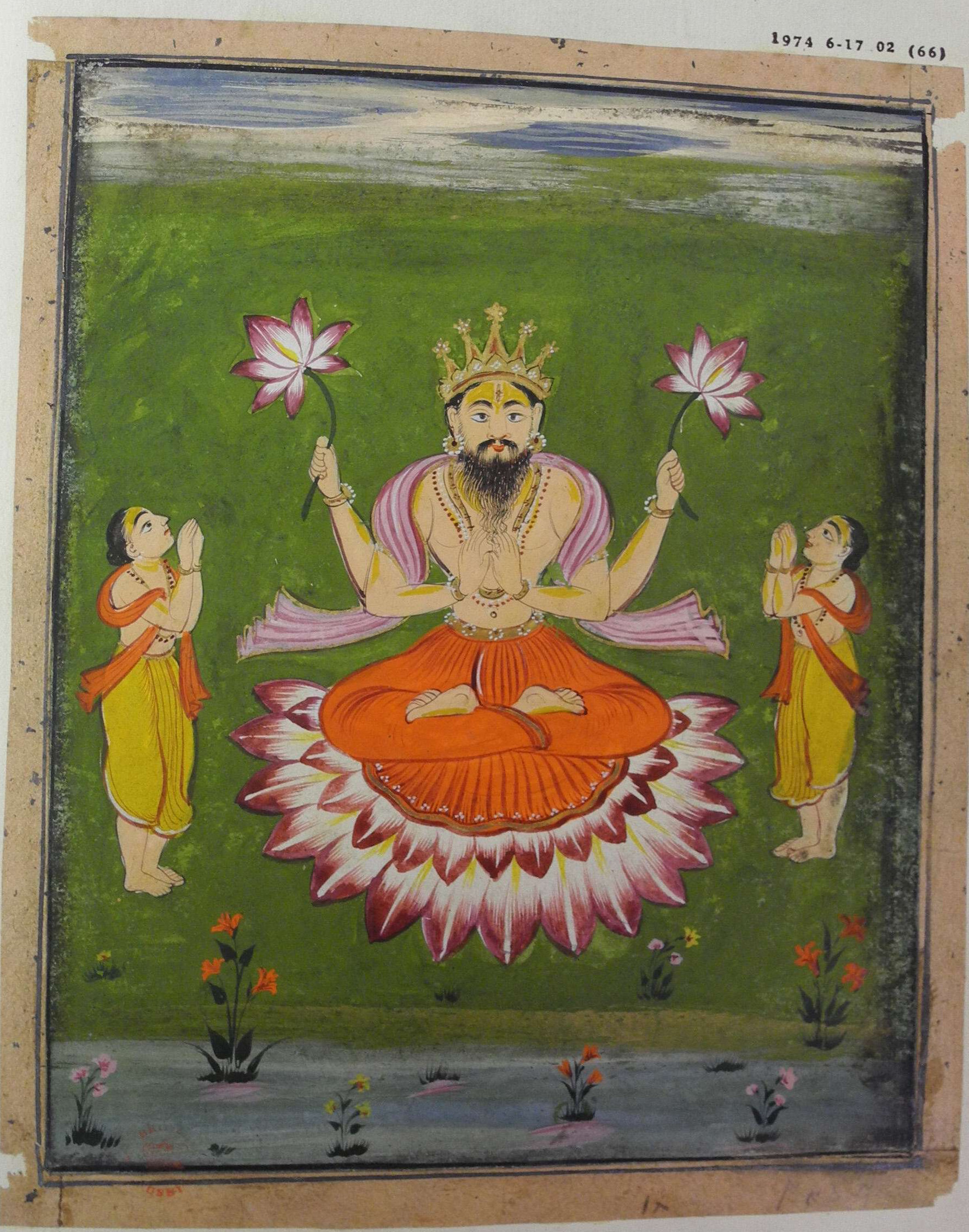
Hindu depiction of Buddha as an avatar of Viṣṇu, flanked by two disciples.

Between 450 CE and the sixth century, Hindus came to see the Buddha as an avatar of Vishnu. The first account of this appears in the Vishnu Purana. The word Buddha is also mentioned in several of the Puranas, which are held by modern scholars to have been composed after the Buddha's time.

The Bhāgavata Purāṇa states that "when the Kali Age has begun, in order to delude the enemies of the gods, Visnu will be born as the Buddha." In the Bhagavata and Vishnu Puranas, the main purpose of this incarnation was to destroy certain demons who had managed to learn Vedic rites and asceticism. For this purpose, Vishnu descended as the Buddha and taught a heresy to the demons so that they would abandon the Vedas and asceticism and lose their power, allowing them to be destroyed. According to the Vishnu Purana, these demons also taught this heresy to others who became Buddhists and abandoned the true Dharma. This allowed the gods to kill them. Similarly, the Bhaviṣya Purāṇa states that during the first stage of the Kali Yuga, when Vishnu was born as Shakyamuni, "the path of the Vedas was destroyed and all men became Buddhists. Those who sought refuge with Vishnu were deluded."

In spite of the isolated presence of a negative association of the Buddha avatar with demons and heresy, some Hindus in the post-Puranic period also came to accept the Buddha avatar's teaching as being a positive teaching. Thus, the Varaha Purana and the Matsya Purana associate the Buddha avatar with beauty. The Devibhagavata Purana states that Vishnu "became incarnate as the Buddha in order to stop the slaughter of animals and to destroy the sacrifices of the wicked." Likewise, the Vaishnava poet Jayadeva (12th century) states that Vishnu became Buddha out of compassion for animals and to end bloody sacrifices.

Helmuth von Glasenapp held that the Buddha avatar myths came from a desire in Hinduism to absorb Buddhism peacefully.

==== Hindu deities in Buddhism ====
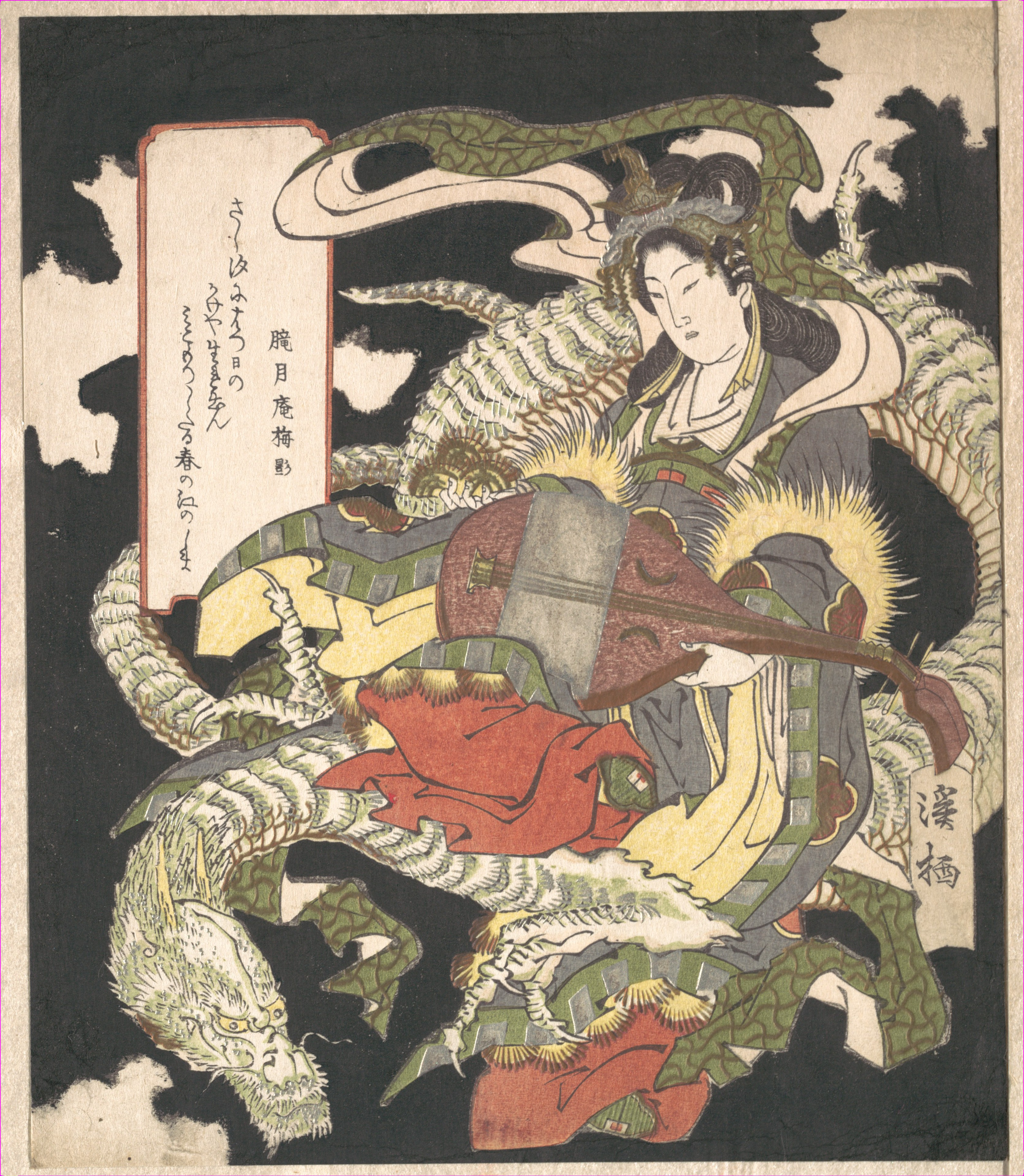
A Japanese Buddhist depiction of Benzaiten (Saraswati), the Goddess of Music and Good Fortune

Through its history, Buddhism borrowed and integrated various Hindu deities (or the qualities of Hindu deities) into their tradition. Mahayana Buddhist texts like the Kāraṇḍavyūhasūtra consider Hindu deities such as Vishnu, Shiva, Brahma and Saraswati as being bodhisattvas as well as emanations of Avalokiteshvara. Similarly, the popular Nīlakaṇṭha Dhāraṇī is a Mahayana dhāraṇī said to have been recited by Avalokiteshvara which praises the names of Harihara (a composite of Shiva and Vishnu).

Other Hindu deities adopted into Buddhism include Hayagrīva and Ganesh. During the tantric age, the Buddhist Vajrayana tradition adopted fierce tantric deities like Mahakala and Bhairava.

Theravada Buddhism also adopted some Hindu deities, the most important of which is Upulvan (i.e. Vishnu), who is seen as a guardian of Sri Lanka and as a bodhisattva.

==== Debate ====
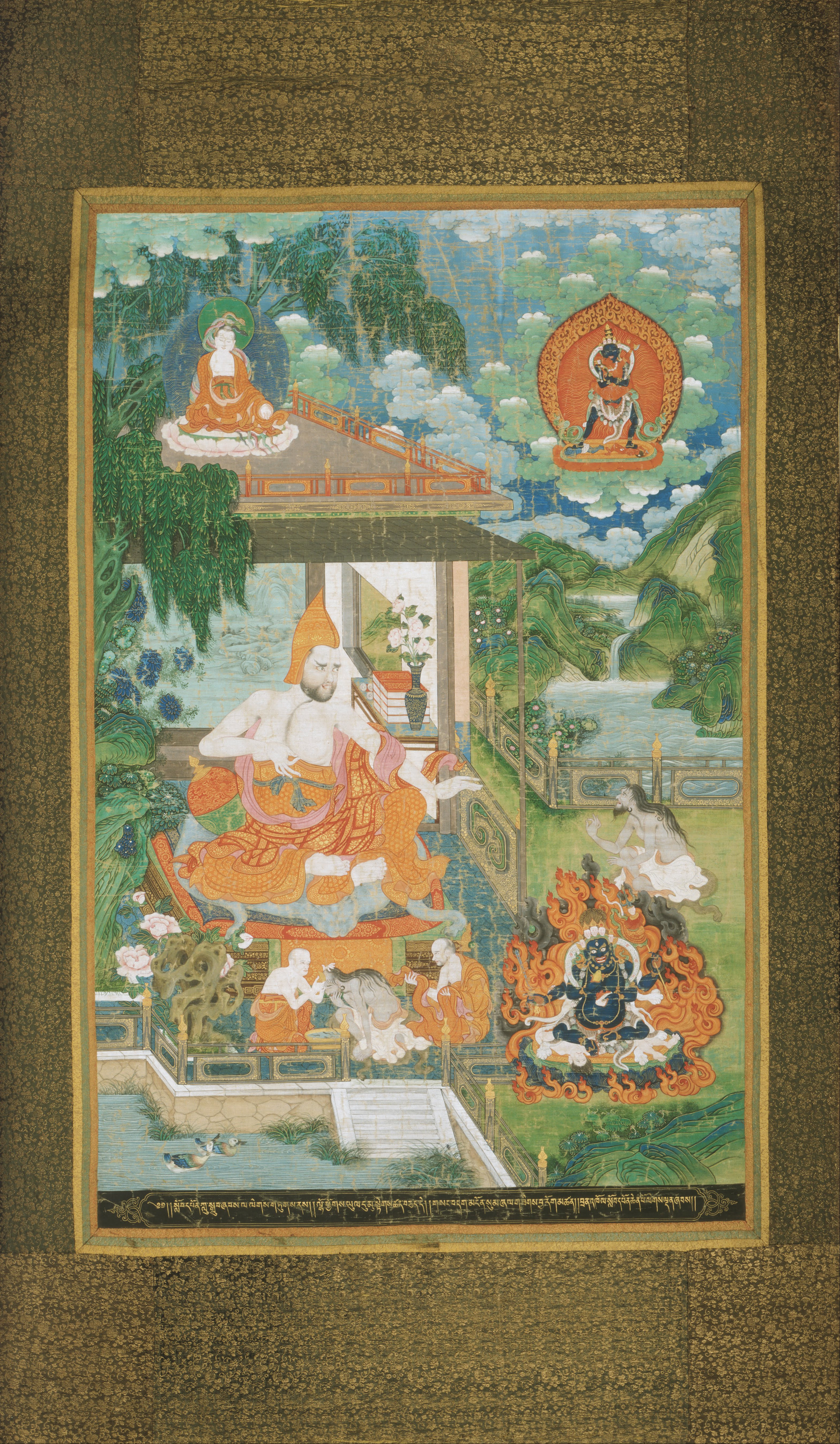
A Tibetan style painting depicting the Buddhist philosopher Bhāviveka converting a tirthika (non-Buddhist) through debate.

Buddhist and Hindu philosophers often engaged in debate in ancient India. This was done in person and also in written texts. According to Bronkhorst, consistent systematic debates between Buddhists and Hindus intensifies after the 5th century CE, though discussions had also occurred previously.

Buddhist philosophers often criticized Hindu thinkers. Some of the most common targets for criticism were the theory of the atman and the theory of Ishvara (a creator God). Both views are criticized by Buddhist thinkers like Vasubandhu. The Buddhist philosopher Nagarjuna is known for his extensive critiques of Nyaya school of Hindu philosophy. The Buddhist Bhavaviveka outlined numerous Hindu philosophies in his Madhyamakahrdaya and attempted to refute them.

In turn, Hindu theologians like Adi Śaṅkara, Kumārila Bhaṭṭa and various Nyaya school philosophers (like Vātsāyana) likewise critiqued Buddhist thought in their various works. Śaṅkara accuses the Buddha of being "a man given to make incoherent assertions" and "propound absurd doctrines."

According to Śaṅkara, the Buddhist not-self doctrine fails because a cognizer beyond cognition can be demonstrated from difference between the existence of the witness consciousness and what it knows (the numerous diverse ideas). Furthermore, a conscious agent would avoid infinite regress, since there would be no necessity to posit another knower. Śaṅkara thought that no doubts could be raised about the Self, for the act of doubting implies at the very least the existence of the doubter (even though Buddhism does have corresponding theories of the mind and consciousness, see: citta and eight consciousnesses).

Vidyaranya, another Advaita Vedantic philosopher, expresses this argument as:

No one can doubt the fact of his own existence. Were one to do so, who would the doubter be?

The Vedanta critiques were answered by later Buddhist thinkers. According to Klostermaier:

Kumārila Bhaṭṭa in his Śloka-vārttika, a thoroughly systematic work, attacked Buddhism methodically. It provoked the Buddhist scholar Śāntarakṣita to counterattack Hinduism in great detail in his magnum opus Tattva-saṅgraha. Quoting extensively from the Śloka-vārttika, Śāntarakṣita demolishes the Hindu positions with great ingenuity and a certain sense of humor. This polemical exchange between Hindus and Buddhists was continued on both sides for centuries. It became customary for Hindu scholars to refute rival Buddhist schools in their writings before expounding their own teachings.

==== Intellectual influences ====
Both Hindu and Buddhist philosophers were influenced by each other's works. Buddhist philosophers like Vasubandhu and Dignaga were influenced by the works of the Nyaya school to develop more sophisticated forms of Buddhist epistemology. Nyaya philosophers, in turn, developed arguments in response to Buddhist philosophical doctrines.

Various thinkers of the Advaita Vedanta school, like Gaudapada and Adi Shankara, were also influenced by Buddhist ideas of the Madhyamaka school. Furthermore, later Advaita philosophers like Śrīharṣa (11th century), and Citsukha (13th century) adopted and utilized many of the arguments of the Buddhist Nagarjuna to show the illusory nature of the world.

Some Hindu philosophers (like the Saiva Utpaladeva) were also influenced by the work of Buddhist epistemologists like Dignaga and Dharmakirti.

=== Co-existence and shared religious sites ===
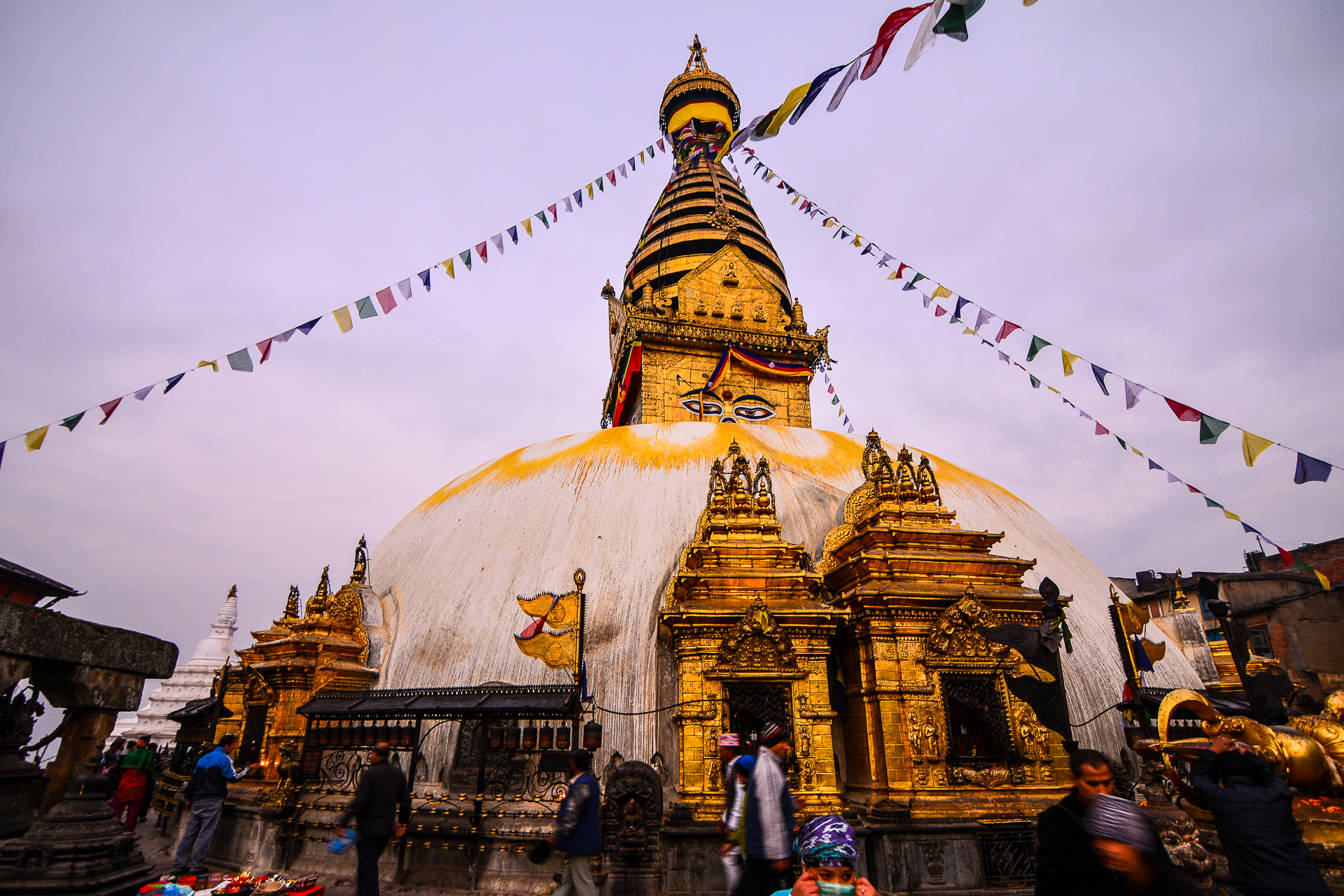
Swayambhunath, Kathmandu, a Nepalese holy site shared by both Buddhists and Hindus.

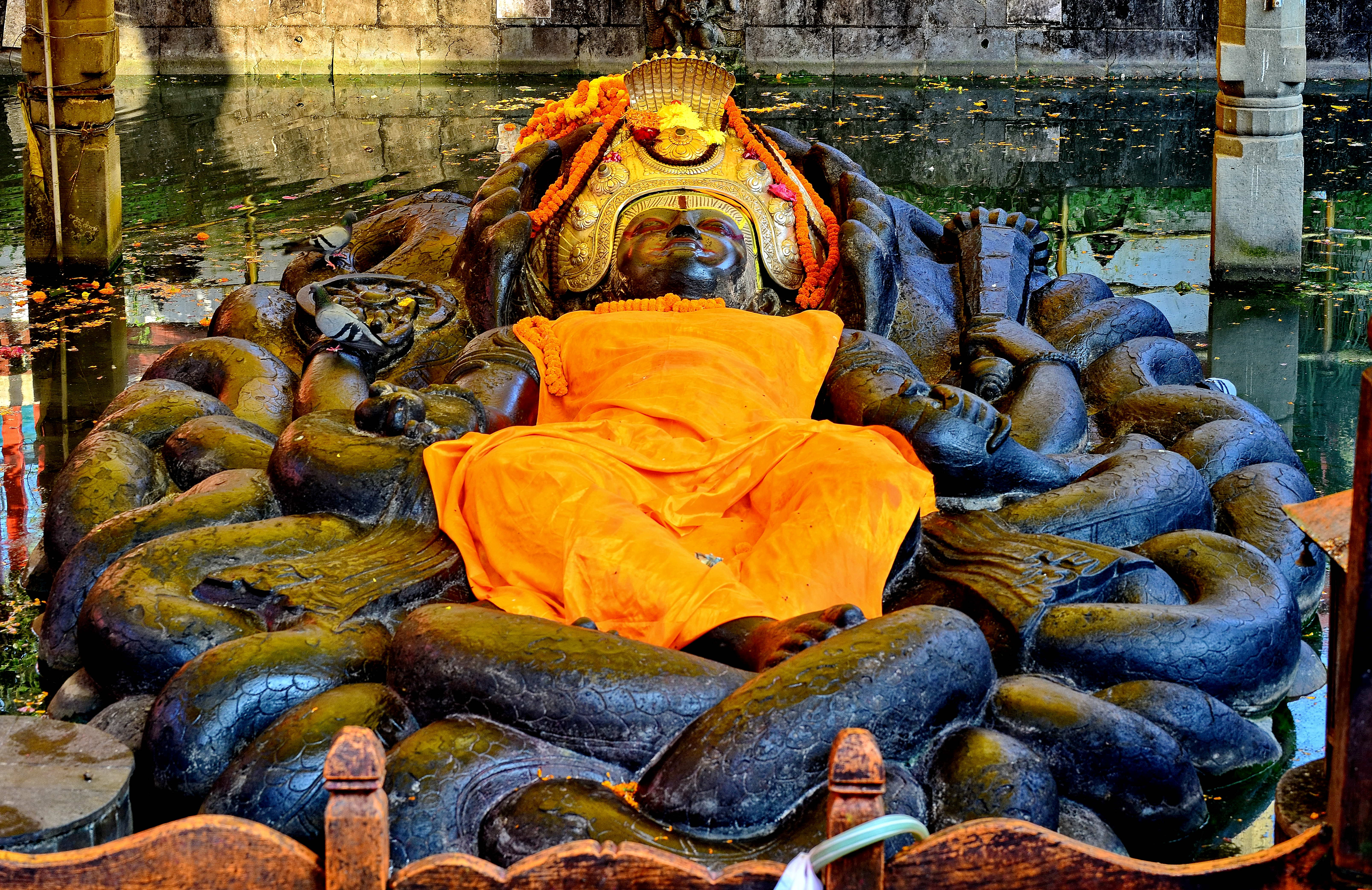
The murti at Budhanilkantha Temple, which is venerated by both Hindus and Buddhists

Many examples exist of temples and religious sites which are or were used by both faiths. These include the Swayambhunath, Bodh Gaya, Boudhanath, Muktinath, Mount Kailash, Ajanta Caves, Ellora Caves, Elephanta Caves, Budhanilkantha and Angkor Wat.

=== Royal support and religious competition ===
Buddhism originated in India and rose to prominence in the Mauryan era through royal support. It started to decline after the Gupta era and virtually disappeared from the Indian subcontinent in the 11th century CE, except in some countries like Nepal. It has continued to exist outside of India and has become the major religion in several Asian countries.

In later years, there is significant evidence that both Buddhism and Hinduism were supported by Indian rulers, regardless of the rulers' own religious identities. Buddhist kings continued to revere Hindu deities and teachers and many Buddhist temples were built under the patronage of Hindu rulers. Kalidasa's work shows the ascension of Hinduism at the expense of Buddhism.

By the eighth century, Shiva and Vishnu had replaced Buddha in pujas of royalty.

== Notable views ==
=== By Hindus ===
According to Klostermaier, while "virtually all the later commentators of the Vedānta-sūtras include anti-Buddhist polemics in their works", "anti-Buddhist polemic continued in Hindu scholarly literature and became a standard part of the Hindu scholastic curriculum" (even after the decline of Buddhism in India).

However, during the Modern Era, Hindu scholars began to address Buddhism with a more friendly attitude. Swami Vivekananda often described the Buddha in positive terms, and also visited Bodh Gaya several times. He nevertheless sometimes expressed an ambivalent attitude towards Buddhism. Vivekananda wrote that "Hinduism cannot live without Buddhism and Buddhism not without Hinduism. [...] The Buddhists cannot stay without the brain and philosophy of the Brahmins, nor the Brahmins without the heart of the Buddhists. [...] Let us then join the wonderful intellect of the Brahmin with the heart, the noble soul, the wonderful humanizing power of the Great Master." However, he also wrote that "in spite of its wonderful moral strength, Buddhism was extremely iconoclastic and much of its force being spent in merely negative attempts, it had to die out in the land of its birth and what remained of it became full of superstitions and ceremonials, a hundred times cruder than those it was intended to suppress."

Vivekananda particularly criticised Buddhism for its extreme emphasis on the monastic way of life.

Vivekananda said that though the goals of Buddhism and the Vedic religion are same, the means adopted by Buddhism were wrong and brought degradation upon the people. Vivekananda said Buddhism not only curtailed the different needs of life that the Vedic religion held harmoniously for the people, namely dharma, artha, kama, moksha, but also hermetically sealed them and presented only monasticism as the ideal. Accusing Buddhism's emphasis on monasticism as a cause for its own downfall, as well as for that of the Indian nation, Vivekananda said "The real cause of the downfall is here. Monasticism is all very good for a few; but when you preach it in such a fashion that every man or woman who has a mind immediately gives up social life, when you find over the whole of India monasteries, some containing a hundred thousand monks, sometimes twenty thousand monks in one building—huge, gigantic buildings, these monasteries, scattered all over India and, of course, centres of learning, and all that—who were left to procreate progeny, to continue the race? Only the weaklings. All the strong and vigorous minds went out. And then came national decay by the sheer loss of vigour..." Vivekananda said Buddha ruined India, inasmuch as Christ ruined the Greco-Roman world, and while Europe was later saved by the reformation Protestants, India was by the likes of Kumarila, Shankara, and Ramanuja who had firmly re-established the Vedic religion.

Other famous Hindu figures saw the Buddha as a great Hindu that greatly influenced Hinduism. Gandhi called the Buddha "a Hindu of Hindus" who "was saturated with the best that was in Hinduism" and "gave life to some of the teachings that were buried in the Vedas and which were overgrown with weeds". Gandhi also said:

It is my deliberate opinion that the essential part of the teachings of the Buddha now forms an integral part of Hinduism. It is impossible for Hindu India today to retrace her steps and go behind the great reformation that Gautama effected in Hinduism. [...] What Hinduism did not assimilate of what passes as Buddhism today was not an essential part of the Buddha's life and his teachings.

Sarvepalli Radhakrishnan has claimed that the Buddha did not look upon himself as an innovator, but only a restorer of the way of the Upanishads. However, there is no evidence that the Buddha accepted the Upanishads.

Steven Collins sees such Hindu claims regarding Buddhism as part of a modernist effort to show that Hinduism is unique in its universalism regarding world religions.

Other modern Hindus, like Vir Savarkar, criticize Buddhism on nationalist grounds. Savarkar saw Buddhism as the cause for India's downfall, since it spread the doctrine of ahimsa (nonviolence) among the warrior class and deprived India of its warriors, which allowed the Huns and other invaders to conquer India.

=== Buddhists ===
Ancient Buddhists philosophers like Dharmakirti have historically been staunch critics of Hindu belief and practice. Perhaps the most vehement modern Buddhist critic of Hinduism was the Indian jurist Bhimrao Ramji Ambedkar. Ambedkar blamed the Hindu caste ideology found in Hindu śāstras like the Manusmṛti for the marginalized state of the Indian Dalits. Because of this he renounced Hinduism, converted to Buddhism and convinced many Dalits to follow suit, launching the Dalit Buddhist movement.

However, other Buddhists have emphasized the similarities and harmony between Buddhism and Hinduism. The 14th Dalai Lama, in his address to the 1st World Hindu Congress (2014), said that Buddhism and Hinduism are like spiritual brothers which share teachings on compassion, self-discipline, ethics (sila), concentration (samatha) and wisdom (prajña) and who mainly differ in their views of atman and anatman.

The Dalai Lama has also spoken about how Buddhists and Hindus, though they differ in their belief in a creator God, have also learned much from each other through intellectual contact and debate and that this way of dialogue between different religions is part of the greatness of India.

== See also ==
- Brahma (Buddhism)
- Buddha as an Avatar of Vishnu
- Buddhism and Eastern religions
- Buddhism and Jainism
- Creator in Buddhism
- Index of Buddhism-related articles
- Jambudvipa
- Mindful yoga

== Bibliography ==
- Cousins, L.S. (2010), "Buddhism", The Penguin Handbook of the World's Living Religions, Penguin, ISBN 978-0-14-195504-9
- Doniger, Wendy (2010), The Hindus: An Alternative History, Oxford University Press, ISBN 978-0-19-959334-7
- Flood, Gavin D. (1996), An Introduction to Hinduism, Cambridge University Press, ISBN 978-0-521-43878-0
- Fuller, C. J. (2004), The Camphor Flame: Popular Hinduism and Society in India, Princeton, NJ: Princeton University Press, ISBN 978-0-691-12048-5
- Gethin, Rupert (2008), Sayings of the Buddha, Oxford University Press
- Ghurye, Govind Sadashiv (1980), The Scheduled Tribes of India, Transaction Publishers, ISBN 978-1-4128-3885-6
- Gombrich, Richard F. (1988), Theravāda Buddhism: A Social History from Ancient Benares to Modern Colombo, London: Routledge, ISBN 978-0-415-07585-5
- Gombrich, Richard F. (1996), Theravāda Buddhism. A Social History from Ancient Benares to Modern Colombo, London: Routledge, ISBN 978-0-415-07585-5
- Gombrich, Richard (1997). How Buddhism Began: The Conditioned Genesis of the Early Teachings. New Delhi: Munshiram Manoharlal Publishers. ISBN 81-215-0812-6.
- Gomez, Luis O. (2013), Buddhism in India. In: Joseph Kitagawa, "The Religious Traditions of Asia: Religion, History, and Culture", Routledge, ISBN 978-1-136-87590-8
- Halbfass, Wilhelm (1991), Tradition and Reflection, SUNY Press, ISBN 978-0-7914-0361-7
- Hiltebeitel, Alf (2002), Hinduism. In: Joseph Kitagawa, "The Religious Traditions of Asia: Religion, History, and Culture", Routledge, ISBN 978-1-136-87597-7
- Hiltebeitel, Alf (2007), Hinduism. In: Joseph Kitagawa, "The Religious Traditions of Asia: Religion, History, and Culture". Digital printing 2007, Routledge, ISBN 978-1-136-87590-8
- Hopfe, Lewis M.; Woodward, Mark R. (2008), Religions of the World, Pearson Education, ISBN 978-0-13-606177-9
- Jaini, Padmanabh S. (2001), Collected Paper on Buddhist Studies, Motilal Banarsidass, ISBN 978-81-208-1776-0
- Johnson, W.J. (2009), A Dictionary of Hinduism, Oxford University Press, ISBN 978-0-19-861025-0
- Jones, Constance; Ryan, James D. (2006), Encyclopedia of Hinduism, Infobase Publishing, ISBN 978-0-8160-7564-5
- Larson, Gerald (1995), India's Agony Over Religion, SUNY Press, ISBN 978-0-7914-2411-7
- Larson, Gerald James (2009), Hinduism. In: "World Religions in America: An Introduction", pp. 179-198, Westminster John Knox Press, ISBN 978-1-61164-047-2
- Lockard, Craig A. (2007), Societies, Networks, and Transitions. Volume I: to 1500, Cengage Learning, ISBN 978-0-618-38612-3
- Michaels, Axel (2004), Hinduism. Past and present, Princeton, New Jersey: Princeton University Press
- Narayanan, Vasudha (2009), Hinduism, The Rosen Publishing Group, ISBN 978-1-4358-5620-2
- Nath, Vijay (2001), "From 'Brahmanism' to 'Hinduism': Negotiating the Myth of the Great Tradition", Social Scientist, 29 (3/4): 19–50, doi:10.2307/3518337, JSTOR 3518337
- Queen, Christopher S.; King, Sallie B., eds. (1996). Engaged Buddhism: Buddhist Liberation Movements in Asia. State University of New York Press. ISBN 978-0-7914-2844-3.
- Raju, P. T. (1992), The Philosophical Traditions of India, Delhi: Motilal Banarsidass Publishers
- Robinson, Richard; Johnson, Willard; Thanissaro, Bhikkhu (Geoffrey DeGraff) (2005). Buddhist Religions: A Historical Introduction. Belmont, California: Wadsworth/Thomson Learning. ISBN 0-534-55858-5.
- Samuel, Geoffrey (2010), The Origins of Yoga and Tantra. Indic Religions to the Thirteenth Century, Cambridge University Press
- Shults, Brett (2014), "On the Buddha's Use of Some Brahmanical Motifs in Pali Texts", Journal of the Oxford Centre for Buddhist Studies, 6: 121–129, archived from the original on 27 April 2016
- Sjoberg, Andree F. (1990), "The Dravidian Contribution to the Development of Indian Civilization: A Call for a Reassessment", Comparative Civilizations Review, 23: 40–74
- Tiwari, Shiv Kumar (2002), Tribal Roots of Hinduism, Sarup & Sons
- Werner, Karel (2005), A Popular Dictionary of Hinduism, Routledge, ISBN 978-1-135-79753-9
- White, David Gordon (2006), Kiss of the Yogini: "Tantric Sex" in its South Asian Contexts, University of Chicago Press, ISBN 978-0-226-02783-8
- Zaehner, R. C. (1969), The Bhagavad Gītā, Oxford University Press, ISBN 0-19-501666-1
- Zimmer, Heinrich (1951), Philosophies of India, Princeton University Press
