= Tattvasamgraha =

Text written by the 8th century Indian Buddhist pandit Śāntarakṣita

The Tattva-saṃgraha is a text written by the 8th century Indian Buddhist pandit Śāntarakṣita. The text belongs to the 'tenets' (Siddhanta, Tib. sgrub-mtha) genre and is an encyclopedic survey of Buddhist and non-Buddhist philosophical systems in the 8th century.

Śāntarakṣita's student Kamalaśīla wrote a commentary on it, entitled Tattva-saṃgraha-pañjikā.

== Description ==
Composed of 3,645 verses, this work contains a detailed exposition of Buddhist epistemological, Hindu, and Jain works, even those currently non-extant. It is one of the key sources for understanding philosophical works written in the second half of the first millennium, since it often quotes directly from the sources it surveys. Scholars have argued that, through qualifiers of pratītyasamutpāda, the initial statement (ādivākya) of the text, which consists of six verses, serves as a table of contents for the twenty-six chapters of the work, which are called "investigations" (parīkṣā). For example, the qualifier "which is devoid of the operation of primordial matter" correponds to the first chapter of the work on an investigation of primordial matter, and the qualifier "which is devoid of the operation of God" corresponds to the second chapter that investigates God.

== Chapters ==
The Tattva-saṃgraha has twenty-six chapters on the following topics:

1. The Sāṃkhya doctrine of primordial matter (prakṛti) as the source of the physical world
2. Various doctrines of God as the source of the world
3. The doctrine of inherent natures (svabhāva) as the source of the world
4. Bhartṛhari’s doctrine of Brahman-as-language as the source of the world
5. The Sāṃkhya-Yoga doctrine of human spirit (puruṣa)
6. Examination of the doctrines of the self (ātman) in the Nyāya, Mīmāṃsā, Sāṃkhya, Digambara Jaina, Advaita and Buddhist personalist (pudgalavādin) schools
7. The doctrine of the permanence of things
8. Various doctrines of karma and its ripening
9. A critical examination of substance
10. A critical examination of quality
11. A critical examination of action
12. A critical examination of universals
13. A critical examination of particularity
14. A critical examination of inherence (the relation between universals and particulars and between substances and qualities)
15. An examination of words and their meanings
16. An examination of sense perception
17. An examination of inference
18. An examination of other means of acquiring knowledge
19. A critical examination of Jaina epistemology
20. An examination of time
21. A critical examination of materialism
22. On the external world (that is, the world external to consciousness)
23. A critical examination of revelation as a source of knowledge
24. Examination of the idea that some propositions are self-validating
25. Examination of the notion of supernormal powers
