= Timeline of the Tibetan Empire =

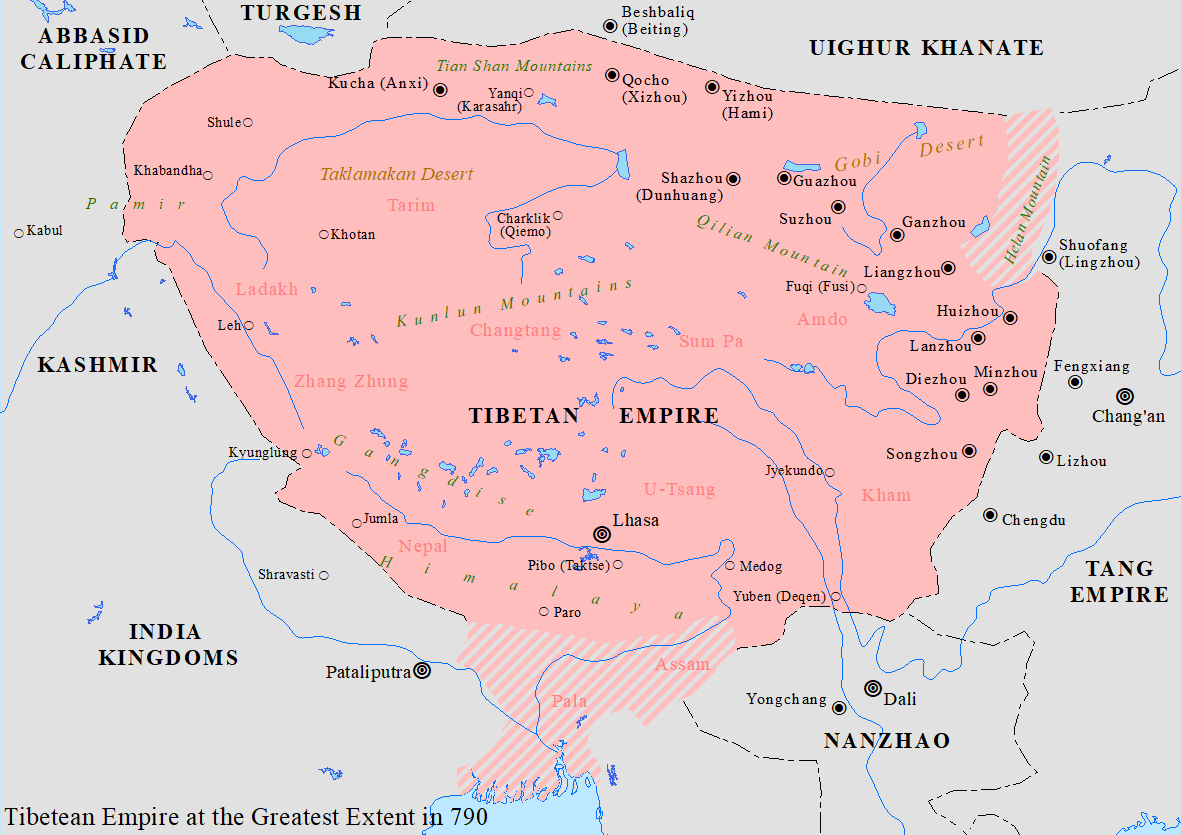
Tibetan Empire at its greatest extent in 790

This is a timeline of the Tibetan Empire from 6th to 9th century.

== 7th century ==
| Year | Date | Event |
|---|---|---|
| 618 | | The 32nd king Namri Songtsen dies and his son Songtsen Gampo succeeds him, at which point their kingdom is known as "Tibet" to foreigners, and still as "Bod" to Tibet's inhabitants. |
| 621 | | Narendradeva of Nepal's Licchavi kingdom exiles to Tibet |
| 622 | | Princess Bhrikuti Devi of Nepal's Licchavi becomes first wife of Songsten Gampo, brings statue Jowo Mikyo Dorje to Tibet |
| 627 | | Tang dynasty and Uyghur forces engage in battle with the Turks and Tibetans |
| 634 | | Songtsen Gampo of the Tibetan Empire sends an embassy to the Tang |
| 634 | | Songtsen Gampo of the Tibetan Empire annexes Zhangzhung |
| 637 | | Songtsen Gampo of the Tibetan Empire defeats Tuyuhun and subjugates the Tanguts and White Wolf people |
| 638 | | Tibetan attack on Songzhou: Songtsen Gampo of the Tibetan Empire attacks the city of Songzhou (now modern Songpan in Sichuan) |
| 638 | | Minister Gar Tongtsen Yulsung of the Tibetan Empire arrives in Tang to ask for a princess bride |
| 640 | | Minister Gar Tongtsen Yulsung of the Tibetan Empire arrives in Tang with tribute and successfully requests for a princess bride |
| 641 | | Songtsen Gampo of the Tibetan Empire sends Narendradeva back to Nepal's Licchavi kingdom with an army, and establishes him as king and Tibetan subject |
| 641 | | Princess Wencheng, an imperial sororal kin of the Tang dynasty, arrives in Tibet as Songtsen Gampo's fourth wife |
| 648 | | Songtsen Gampo of the Tibetan Empire attacks Arjuna, usurper of Harsha of Mithila, for accosting the Tang ambassador Wang Xuance |
| 649 | | Songtsen Gampo dies and his grandson Mangsong Mangtsen succeeds him; Minister Gar Tongtsen Yulsung becomes regent |
| 655 | | Minister Gar Tongtsen Yulsung of the Tibetan Empire writes a code of laws |
| 656 | | Tibetan Empire attacks Lesser Bolü |
| 656 | | Tibetan Empire defeats the Bailan tribe |
| 660 | | Minister Gar Tongtsen Yulsung of the Tibetan Empire defeats Tuyuhun, conquers Wakhan, and their Turkic allies attack Shule. The Tang army under Su Dingfang withdrew and did not engage in combat |
| 663 | | Tibetan Empire conquers Tuyuhun and attacks Khotan but is repelled |
| 665 | | Tibetan Empire and Turkic allies attack Khotan |
| 667 | | Minister Gar Tongtsen Yulsung dies |
| 670 | | Battle of Dafei River: Minister Gar Trinring Tsendro of the Tibetan Empire destroys Tang general Xue Rengui's allegedly 100,000 strong army, captures Kucha, and attacks Aksu |
| 673 | | Tang recaptures Kucha |
| 676 | | Tibetan Empire attacks Diezhou, Fuzhou, and Jingzhou. Fengtian and Wugong are sacked. |
| 677 | | Mangsong Mangtsen dies and his son Tridu Songtsen becomes emperor. |
| 677 | | Tibetan Empire captures Kucha |
| 678 | | Minister Gar Trinring Tsendro of the Tibetan Empire defeats a Tang army northeast of the Amdo region |
| 679 | | Tang general Pei Xingjian defeats the Tibetan Army and re-establishes control over the Western Regions |
| 680 | | Tibetan Empire captures of the fortress of Anrong in Sichuan |
| 681 | | Tibetan Empire invades the Amdo region but is defeated by a Tang army |
| 687 | | Tibetan Empire establishes control over the Western Regions |
| 690 | | Minister Gar Trinring Tsendro of the Tibetan Empire defeats Tang general Wei Daijia's army at Issyk-Kul |
| 692 | | Tang forces reconquer the Four Garrisons of Anxi from Tibetan Empire |
| 694 | | Tibetan Empire attacks the Stone City and suffers a defeat |
| 696 | | Tibetan Empire defeats the Tang army at Taozhou and attacks Liangzhou |
| 699 | | Minister Gar Trinring Tsendro dies in a confrontation with the emperor Tridu Songtsen, and Tsendro's army exiles to Tang |

== 8th century ==
| Year | Date | Event |
|---|---|---|
| 700 | | Tridu Songtsen of the Tibetan Empire attacks Hezhou and Liangzhou |
| 701 | | Tridu Songtsen of the Tibetan Empire allies with Turks and attacks Liangzhou, Songzhou, and Taozhou |
| 702 | | Tibetan Empire attacks Maozhou |
| 703 | | Tridu Songtsen of the Tibetan Empire subjugates the White and Black Mywa of Nanzhao |
| 704 | | Tibetan Empire attacks Termez |
| 704 | | Tridu Songtsen dies and his son Lha of Tibet succeeds him |
| 705 | | Khri ma lod dethrones Lha of Tibet and installs Me Agtsom, another son of Tridu Songtsen |
| 710 | | Tibetan Empire conquers Lesser Bolü |
| 710 | | Princess Jincheng, a great-granddaughter of Emperor Gaozong of Tang, is sent to Tibet as a bride; the Tibetans are granted Jiuqu (九曲), the land north of the Yellow River in Gansu by Emperor Ruizong of Tang |
| 710 | | Zhang Xuanbiao of the Tang dynasty invades northeastern Tibet |
| 714 | | Tibetan Empire attacks Lintao and Weiyuan as well as Lanzhou and Weizhou, but ultimately suffers a major defeat and is repelled |
| 715 | | Tibetan Empire attacks Fergana, a Tang vassal, and the Beiting Protectorate and Songzhou |
| 717 | | Tibetan Empire attacks Aksu and the Stone City. |
| 720 | | Tibetan Empire seizes the Stone City |
| 722 | | Tang frees Lesser Bolü |
| 723 | | Princess Jincheng writes to Lalitaditya Muktapida of the Karkoṭa Empire asking for asylum. In response he contacts the Zabulistan and forms an alliance against the Tibetan Empire. |
| 726 | | Takdra Khönlö of the Tibetan Empire attacks Ganzhou but most of their forces die in a snowstorm and the rest are mopped up by Tang general Wang Junchuo |
| 727 | | Takdra Khönlö and Cog ro Manporje of the Tibetan Empire and their Turgesh allies attack Kucha and Guazhou and Suzhou |
| 728 | | Tibetan Empire attacks Kucha |
| 729 | | Zhang Shougui (張守珪) inflicts a major defeat on the Tibetan Empire at Xining |
| 734 | | Tang and Tibetan Empire demarcate their territory at Chiling Mountain with a boundary tablet |
| 737 | | Tibetan Empire conquers Lesser Bolü |
| 737 | | Hexi jiedushi Cui Xiyi makes a covenant with the Tibetan general in Koko-nor, Yilishu, to relax border defenses so their soldiers can engage in agriculture and animal husbandry. A white dog is sacrificed to seal the covenant. |
| 738 | | Tang captures and loses Anrong to the Tibetan Empire |
| 739 | | Tang scores a major victory against the Tibetan Empire at Shanzhou |
| 740 | | Tang captures Anrong from the Tibetan Empire |
| 741 | | Tibetan Empire attacks Tang in the Qinghai region but is repelled; the Tibetans sack the Stone City on their way back |
| 742 | | Huangfu Weiming of Longyou and Wang Chui of Hexi invade northeastern Tibet and kill several thousand Tibetans |
| 743 | | Huangfu Weiming invades Tibet and recovers the Jiuqu (九曲) area from the Tibetan Empire |
| 745 | | Huangfu Weiming attacks the Tibetan Empire at the Stone City and suffers a major defeat |
| 747 | | Tang captures Lesser Bolü |
| 749 | | Longyou defense command under Geshu Han attacks Tibetan Empire and retakes the Stone City but suffers heavy casualties |
| 753 | | Geshu Han ejects the Tibetans from the "Nine Bends" region on the upper course of the Yellow River |
| 755 | | Me Agtsom is murdered by his ministers and his son Trisong Detsen succeeds him |
| 757 | | Tibetan Empire conquers Shanzhou |
| 763 | | Tibetan Empire conquers Karasahr and invades the Tang dynasty with an army of 100,000 and briefly occupies Chang'an for 15 days before retreating |
| 764 | | Tibetan Empire invades the Tang dynasty with a 70,000 strong army and takes Liangzhou but is repulsed by Yan Wu in Jiannan |
| 765 | | Tibetan Empire invades the Tang dynasty with 30,000 troops and Uyghur allies, advancing as far as Fengtian twice but is repulsed by Guo Ziyi, who convinced the Uyghurs to switch sides |
| 766 | | Tibetan Empire conquers Ganzhou and Suzhou |
| 776 | | Tibetan Empire conquers Guazhou. |
| 781 | | Tibetan Empire conquers Hami. |
| 783 | | Tibetan Empire and Tang sign the Treaty of Qinshui, ending further hostilities |
| 784 | | Tibetan Empire aids Tang in crushing Zhu Ci's rebellion in return for ownership of the Anxi Protectorate and Beiting Protectorate; Tang breaks their promise to cede their protectorates to the Tibetan Empire and as a result the Treaty of Qingshui is annulled |
| 786 | | Tibetan Empire conquers Yanzhou and Xiazhou, Linzhou, and Yinzhou |
| 787 | | Buddhism becomes the official religion in Tibet |
| 787 | | Tibetan Empire double crosses Tang at the Treaty of Pingliang and captures many of the Tang officials and military leaders present |
| 787 | | Tibetan Empire destroys Yanzhou and Xiazhou before abandoning them |
| 787 | | Tibetan Empire captures Dunhuang and Kucha |
| 788 | | Tang defeats the Tibetan Empire at Xizhou |
| 789 | | Tibetan Empire attacks Longzhou, Jingzhou, and Bingzhou |
| 790 | | Tibetan Empire conquers Tingzhou |
| 792 | | Tibetan Empire conquers Gaochang and Khotan |
| 792 | | Uyghur Khaganate evicts Tibetans from Gaochang, Kucha, and Karasahr |
| 793 | | Tang general Wei Gao destroys 50 Tibetan strongholds and defeats a 30,000 strong Tibetan army, recovering Yanzhou |
| 794 | | Trisong Detsen abdicates and his son Muné Tsenpo succeeds him< |
| 796 | | Tibetan Empire attacks Qingzhou but the campaign abruptly ends when chief minister Nanam Shang Gyaltsen Lhanang dies |
| 797 | | Trisong Detsen dies |

== 9th century ==
| Year | Date | Event |
|---|---|---|
| 800 | | Sadnalegs becomes emperor of Tibet |
| 801 | | Nanzhao and Tang forces defeat a contingent of Tibetan and Abbasid slave soldiers. |
| 808 | | Uyghur Khaganate captures Liangzhou |
| 808 | | The Chuy branch of Shatuo Turks are defeated by the Tibetan Empire and move to Inner China |
| 809 | | Tibetan Empire attacks Uyghur ambassadors to Tang |
| 810 | | Tibetan Empire raids the Abbasid Caliphate |
| 813 | | Uyghur Khaganate crosses the Gobi Desert and attacks the Tibetans |
| 814 | | Al-Ma'mun of the Abbasid Caliphate invades the Tibetan Empire in Wakhan and Gilgit, where they capture a Tibetan commander and Tibetan cavalrymen, who they send back to Baghdad |
| 815 | | Sadnalegs dies and his son Ralpacan succeeds him< |
| 816 | | Tibetan Empire attacks the Uyghur Khaganate capital of Ordu-Baliq but fails to make it there |
| 819 | | Tibetan Empire attacks Qingzhou |
| 821 | | Changqing Treaty: Tang and the Tibetan Empire sign a treaty of non-aggression with the Tang recognizing Tibet's ownership of the Western Regions as well as the Longyou and Hexi regions in what is now Gansu Province |
| 821 | | Tibetan Empire attacks Tang but are driven off by the governor of Yanzhou |
| 823 | | The Tang-Bo huimeng bei (Stele of the Tang-Tibetan alliance) is set up in Lhasa |
| 838 | | Ralpacan dies and his brother Langdarma succeeds him |
| 842 | | Langdarma dies and the Tibetan Empire enters its Era of Fragmentation |
| 843 | | Karasahr and Kucha are occupied by the Kingdom of Qocho |
| 847 | | Tibetan troops raid the Hexi Corridor but are defeated by Tang troops at Yanzhou |
| 848 | | Zhang Yichao, a resident of Dunhuang, rebels and captures Shazhou and Guazhou from the Tibetans |
| 849 | | Tibetan commanders and soldiers in seven garrisons west of Yuanzhou defect to the Tang |
| 850 | | Zhang Yichao takes Hami, Ganzhou and Suzhou |
| 851 | | Zhang Yichao captures Gaochang and Khotan becomes independent |
| 866 | | Tibetans retreat to the Tibetan Plateau |

== See also ==
- Timeline of the Tang dynasty

== Bibliography ==
- Ancient Tibet: Research Materials from The Yeshe De Project. Berkeley, California: Dharma Publishing. 1986. ISBN 0-89800-146-3.
- Andrade, Tonio (2016), The Gunpowder Age: China, Military Innovation, and the Rise of the West in World History, Princeton University Press, ISBN 978-0-691-13597-7.
- Asimov, M.S. (1998), History of civilizations of Central Asia Volume IV The age of achievement: A.D. 750 to the end of the fifteenth century Part One The historical, social and economic setting, UNESCO Publishing
- Barfield, Thomas (1989), The Perilous Frontier: Nomadic Empires and China, Basil Blackwell
- Barrett, Timothy Hugh (2008), The Woman Who Discovered Printing, Great Britain: Yale University Press, ISBN 978-0-300-12728-7 (alk. paper)
- Beckwith, Christopher I (1987), The Tibetan Empire in Central Asia: A History of the Struggle for Great Power among Tibetans, Turks, Arabs, and Chinese during the Early Middle Ages, Princeton University Press
- Bregel, Yuri (2003), An Historical Atlas of Central Asia, Brill
- Drompp, Michael Robert (2005), Tang China And The Collapse Of The Uighur Empire: A Documentary History, Brill
- Ebrey, Patricia Buckley (1999), The Cambridge Illustrated History of China, Cambridge: Cambridge University Press, ISBN 0-521-66991-X (paperback).
- Ebrey, Patricia Buckley; Walthall, Anne; Palais, James B. (2006), East Asia: A Cultural, Social, and Political History, Boston: Houghton Mifflin, ISBN 0-618-13384-4
- Golden, Peter B. (1992), An Introduction to the History of the Turkic Peoples: Ethnogenesis and State-Formation in Medieval and Early Modern Eurasia and the Middle East, OTTO HARRASSOWITZ · WIESBADEN
- Graff, David A. (2002), Medieval Chinese Warfare, 300-900, Warfare and History, London: Routledge, ISBN 0415239559
- Graff, David Andrew (2016), The Eurasian Way of War Military Practice in Seventh-Century China and Byzantium, Routledge, ISBN 978-0-415-46034-7.
- Haywood, John (1998), Historical Atlas of the Medieval World, AD 600-1492, Barnes & Noble
- Latourette, Kenneth Scott (1964), The Chinese, their history and culture, Volumes 1-2, Macmillan
- Lorge, Peter A. (2008), The Asian Military Revolution: from Gunpowder to the Bomb, Cambridge University Press, ISBN 978-0-521-60954-8
- Millward, James (2009), Eurasian Crossroads: A History of Xinjiang, Columbia University Press
- Needham, Joseph (1986), Science & Civilisation in China, vol. V:7: The Gunpowder Epic, Cambridge University Press, ISBN 0-521-30358-3
- Rong, Xinjiang (2013), Eighteen Lectures on Dunhuang, Brill
- Shaban, M. A. (1979), The ʿAbbāsid Revolution, Cambridge: Cambridge University Press, ISBN 0-521-29534-3
- Shakabpa, Tsepon W. D. (1967), Tibet: A Political History, New Haven & London: Yale University Press
- Sima, Guang (2015), 柏楊版資治通鑑54皇后失蹤, Yuǎnliú chūbǎnshìyè gǔfèn yǒuxiàn gōngsī, ISBN 978-957-32-0876-1
- Skaff, Jonathan Karam (2012), Sui-Tang China and Its Turko-Mongol Neighbors: Culture, Power, and Connections, 580-800 (Oxford Studies in Early Empires), Oxford University Press
- van Schaik, Sam (2011), Tibet: A History, Yale University Press
- Wang, Zhenping (2013), Tang China in Multi-Polar Asia: A History of Diplomacy and War, University of Hawaii Press
- Wangdu, Pasang; Diemberger, Hildegard (2000). dBa' bzhed: The Royal Narrative Concerning the Bringing of the Buddha's Doctrine to Tibet. Wien: Verlag der Österreichischen Akadamie der Wissenschafen. ISBN 3-7001-2956-4.
- Whiting, Marvin C (2002), Imperial Chinese Military History, Writers Club Press
- Wilkinson, Endymion (2015). Chinese History: A New Manual, 4th edition. Cambridge, MA: Harvard University Asia Center distributed by Harvard University Press. ISBN 9780674088467.
- Yuan, Shu (2001), 柏楊版通鑑記事本末28第二次宦官時代, Yuǎnliú chūbǎnshìyè gǔfèn yǒuxiàn gōngsī, ISBN 957-32-4273-7
- Xiong, Victor Cunrui (2000), Sui-Tang Chang'an: A Study in the Urban History of Late Medieval China (Michigan Monographs in Chinese Studies), U OF M CENTER FOR CHINESE STUDIES, ISBN 0892641371
- Xiong, Victor Cunrui (2009), Historical Dictionary of Medieval China, United States of America: Scarecrow Press, Inc., ISBN 978-0810860537
- Xu, Elina-Qian (2005), HISTORICAL DEVELOPMENT OF THE PRE-DYNASTIC KHITAN, Institute for Asian and African Studies 7
- Xue, Zongzheng (1992), Turkic peoples, 中国社会科学出版社
