= Timeline of the Tang dynasty =

This is a timeline of the Tang dynasty. Information on areas and events relevant to the Tang dynasty such as the Wu Zhou interregnum, when Wu Zetian established her own dynasty, and other realms such as the Sui dynasty, Tibetan Empire, Nanzhao, the Three Kingdoms of Korea, Japan, and steppe nomads are also included where necessary.

== 7th century ==
=== 610s ===
Year	Date	Event
617		Shibi Khan of the Eastern Turkic Khaganate aids Li Yuan in his rebellion against the Sui dynasty
618	11 April	Emperor Yang of Sui is killed by strangulation in a coup led by his general Yuwen Huaji in Jiangdu
618	12 June	Li Yuan (Emperor Gaozu of Tang – note that Tang emperor naming convention uses the posthumous Temple Name) deposes Yang You and founds the Tang dynasty; so ends the Sui dynasty
618	29 November	Battle of Qianshuiyuan: Li Shimin defeats pretender Xue Rengao and his short lived state of Qin
619		Wang Bo (王薄) and Du Fuwei surrender to Tang
619		Some of the most powerful independent forces include Wang Shichong in Luoyang, Liu Wuzhou in north Shanxi, Dou Jiande in Hebei, and Shen Faxing in the south
619		Yuwen Huaji is killed by Dou Jiande

=== 620s ===
Year	Date	Event
620		Li Shimin defeats Liu Wuzhou
621	28 May	Battle of Hulao: Tang forces defeat the warlord Dou Jiande and he is captured by Li Shimin
621		Tang forces defeat Wang Shichong and take Luoyang
621		Dou Jiande's general Liu Heita rebels
622		Rebel Li Zitong tries to flee from Chang'an but is arrested and executed
622		Illig Qaghan of the Eastern Turkic Khaganate attacks Tang
623		Tuyuhun invasion of Gansu: Chai Shao defeats a Tuyuhun invasion of Gansu
623		Li Jiancheng defeats Liu Heita; Liu Heita is captured and killed
623		Fu Gongshi declares himself emperor in Danyang, Jiangsu (Nanjing)
624		Fu Gongshi is killed; Tang forces conquer the south
624		Zu Yong Diao tax system is implemented
624		Illig Qaghan of the Eastern Turkic Khaganate and his nephew Tölis Qaghan (Ashina Shibobi) invade the Tang dynasty but Li Shimin contacts Tölis and persuades him not to attack, forcing the invasion to a halt
625		Eastern Turkic Khaganate launches repeated raids in northern frontier areas; some raids reach as far south as Shanxi; largest one was directed by Illig Qaghan against Shuozhou (in north Shanxi) but is repulsed
626	2 July	Xuanwu Gate Incident: Li Shimin kills his brothers the crown prince Li Jiancheng and Li Yuanji at Chang'an
626	4 September	Emperor Gaozu of Tang is forced into retirement and Li Shimin becomes emperor (Taizong)
626	Autumn	Illig Qaghan of the Eastern Turkic Khaganate raids to within a few miles of Chang'an and withdraws after Emperor Taizong of Tang agrees to a payment of tribute.
627		A large number of prefectures and counties are combined or abolished; the Ten Circuits are introduced
627		Tang dynasty and Uyghur forces engage in battle with the Turks and Tibetans
628	3 June	Rebel Liang Shidu dies from assassination
629		Buddhist monk Xuanzang sets off for the west

=== 630s ===
Year	Date	Event
630		Tang campaign against the Eastern Turks: Illig Qaghan of the Eastern Turkic Khaganate is defeated by Li Jing of the Tang dynasty and captured by Li Shiji but released; the Eastern Turkic Khaganate becomes a vassal of Tang; Emperor Taizong of Tang becomes heavenly qaghan
630		Japanese missions to Tang China: Japan sends its first mission to the Tang dynasty
631		Gao Biaoren (高表仁) accompanies Japanese embassy back to Japan
632		Khotan (Yutian) and Kashgar (Shule) submit to the Tang dynasty as vassals
632		Qibi Heli of the Tiele bring more than 1,000 households to Tang
634		Yong'an Palace (永安宮) (Daming Palace) is completed
634		Songtsen Gampo of the Tibetan Empire sends an embassy to the Tang
635		Emperor Taizong's campaign against Tuyuhun: Emperor Taizong of Tang launches a campaign against Tuyuhun, a Xianbei empire to the west, and annexes the area
635		Yarkand (Shache) submits to the Tang dynasty.
635		Yong'an Palace renamed Daming Palace
636		The fubing system is revised to comprise 634 intrepid garrisons (zhechong fu 折衝府)
638		Gar Tongtsen Yulsung of the Tibetan Empire arrives in Tang to ask for a princess bride
638		The Tibetan Empire attacks the city of Songzhou, now modern Songpan, in Sichuan
639		Census estimates a total population of 50 million residing within Tang administered territory

=== 640s ===
Year	Date	Event
640		Tang campaign against Karakhoja: Hou Junji conquers Karakhoja and annexes Gaochang (Turpan, Xinjiang); the Protectorate General to Pacify the West is created
640		Gar Tongtsen Yulsung of the Tibetan Empire arrives in Tang with tribute and successfully requests for a princess bride
641		Princess Wencheng, an imperial sororal kin of the Tang dynasty, arrives in Tibet as Songtsen Gampo's bride
643		Crown Prince Li Chengqian is deposed
644		Emperor Taizong of Tang starts preparations for a campaign against Goguryeo
644		Tang campaigns against Karasahr: Tang general Guo Xiaoke attacks Karasahr and achieves military victory but Karasahr remains a vassal of the Western Turkic Khaganate
644		Aksu (Gumo) submits to Tang
645		First campaign in the Goguryeo–Tang War: Emperor Taizong of Tang leads an invasion of Goguryeo in person but withdraws after failure to conquer Anshi (northeast of Yingkou, Liaoning)
645		Xuanzang returns from India
646		Emperor Taizong's campaign against Xueyantuo: Tang forces defeat Xueyantuo in battle and their khan surrenders
647		Li Shiji leads another campaign against Goguryeo, but does not succeed
648		Emperor Taizong of Tang launches one more campaign against Goguryeo unsuccessfully
648		Tang campaign against Kucha: Tang general Ashina She'er conquers Kucha (Qiuci)
648		Songtsen Gampo of the Tibetan Empire attacks Arjuna, usurper of Harsha of Mithila, for accosting the Tang ambassador Wang Xuance
648		Khitans submit to Tang as vassals
649	10 July	Emperor Taizong of Tang succumbs to illness, possibly from the pills he took from his alchemists, and dies, his son Li Zhi succeeds him and becomes Emperor Gaozong of Tang
649		The campaign against Goguryeo is called off

=== 650s ===
Year	Date	Event
650		Earliest known extant piece of printed text appears in Chang'an: a fragment of a Buddhist dhāraṇī scroll written in Sanskrit, known as the Great spell of unsullied pure light (Wugou jingguang da tuoluoni jing 無垢淨光大陀羅尼經)
653		A woman claims the title of emperor and rises in rebellion, causing widespread disruption for a few weeks before she is defeated and dies
655		Wu Zetian is set up as empress
656		Cheng Yaojin defeats the Karluk and Turgesh forces of the Western Turkic Khaganate
657		Battle of Irtysh River: Ashina Helu of the Western Turkic Khaganate is defeated by Su Dingfang of the Tang dynasty
658		Conquest of the Western Turks: Ashina Helu of the Western Turkic Khaganate is defeated by Su Dingfang of the Tang dynasty and lives out the rest of his days in Chang'an; the Western Turkic Khaganate is annexed by Tang
658		Luoyang becomes the Eastern Capital
659		Evidence of a dental amalgam appears in the medical text Newly Revised Herbal Foundation (《新修本草》, Xīnxiū Běncǎo) written by Su Gong (苏恭), manufactured from tin and silver.

=== 660s ===
Year	Date	Event
660		Su Dingfang defeats Baekje
660		Tibetan Empire and their Turkic allies attack Shule
660		Tang attacks the Khitans and captures their leader Abugu, sending him back to Luoyang
660		Emperor Gaozong of Tang begins suffering from severe headaches as well as loss of vision and yields decision-making power to Wu Zetian
661		Su Dingfang lays siege to Pyongyang
661		Peroz III of the Sasanian Empire requests military aid from Tang against the Arab invasion of Persia
662		Tang troops lift siege of Pyongyang due to lack of food supplies
662		Liu Rengui inflicts a fatal blow on Baekje
662		The Daming Palace is rebuilt
663		Battle of Baekgang: Liu Rengui and others vanquish Baekje, having defeated a combined Baekje and Yamato fleet
663		Tibetan Empire attacks Yutian but are repelled
663		The Daming Palace is completed
664		Liu Rengui sends a memorial to the emperor reporting low morale of troops in Korea
664		Emperor Gaozong of Tang makes a failed attempt to depose Wu Zetian
665		Wu Zetian becomes the de facto ruler
665		Tibetan Empire and Turkic allies attack Yutian
667		Xue Rengui achieves a decisive victory against Goguryeo
668		Li Shiji sacks Pyongyang and conquers Goguryeo; the Protectorate General to Pacify the East is established
669		General Li Shiji dies

=== 670s ===
Year	Date	Event
670		Battle of Dafei River: Tibetan Empire destroys Xue Rengui's allegedly 100,000 strong army, captures Qiuci, and attacks Gumo
670		Peroz III arrives at the Tang court
673		Tang captures Qiuci
673		Tang consolidates control over the Wudoulu Turks living in the area that came to be known as Dzungaria
675		Tang defeats Silla in Gyeonggi
676		Tibetan Empire attacks Die, Fu, and Jing prefectures. Fengtian and Wugong are sacked.
676		The Protectorate General to Pacify the East relocates to Liaoyang
677		Tibetan Empire captures Qiuci
677		Ashina Duzhi, previously a Tang general tasked with controlling the Wuduolu Turks, rebels and declares himself Onoq Khagan, ruler of all Turks.
677		The Protectorate General to Pacify the East relocates to Xincheng, in modern Fushun, Liaoning
678		Tibetan Empire defeats a Tang army in the Qinghai region
678		Pei Xingjian (裴行儉) attempts to escort Peroz III back to Persia and makes it as far as Suiye (Tokmok, Kyrgyzstan)
679		Pei Xingjian escorts Peroz's son Narsieh to Suiye, and Narsieh spends 20 years in Tukhara
679		Pei Xingjian defeats a rebellion by Onoq Qaghan (Ashina Fuyan Duzhi 阿史那匐延都支) and Li Zhefu (李遮匐)
679		Pei Xingjiang defeats the Tibetans and re-establishes control over the Tarim oasis states
679		Ashide Wenfu and Ashide Fengzhi of the Chanyu Protectorate make Ashina Nishufu a Khagan and revolt against Tang dynasty.

=== 680s ===
Year	Date	Event
680		Pei Xingjian defeats Ashina Nishufu and Ashina Nishufu is killed by his men.
680		Ashide Wenfu makes Ashina Funian a Khagan and revolts against Tang dynasty.
680		Pei Xingjian convinces Ashina Funian to surrender; Funian is executed in Chang'an
680		Tibetan Empire expands aggressively into Xiyu (Western Regions) and captures of the fortress of Anrong in Sichuan
681		Ilterish Qaghan revolts with the remnants of Ashina Funian's men.
681		Tibetan Empire invades the Qinghai region but is defeated by a Tang army
682		Ilterish Qaghan establishes the Second Turkic Khaganate and attacks Tang
683	27 December	Emperor Gaozong of Tang succumbs to illness and dies, his son Li Xian succeeds him and becomes Emperor Zhongzong of Tang
683		Ilterish Qaghan of the Second Turkic Khaganate attacks Tang
684	26 February	Wu Zetian deposes Emperor Zhongzong of Tang, replaces him with Emperor Ruizong of Tang
684		Xu Jingye rebels in Yangzhou and fails
684		Ilterish Qaghan of the Second Turkic Khaganate attacks Tang
685		Ilterish Qaghan of the Second Turkic Khaganate attacks Tang
686		Tang troops withdraw from the Four Garrisons of Anxi after elements within the court argue for the decrease of military expenditures
687		Ilterish Qaghan of the Second Turkic Khaganate attacks Tang
687		Lý Tự Tiên and Đinh Kiến revolt at Đại La in response to a raise in harvest tax
688		Wu Zetian carries out killing of Tang princes and princesses
689		The ritual structure Mingtang (Hall of Brightness) is set up in Luoyang

=== 690s ===
Year	Date	Event
690	16 October	Wu Zetian starts the first official Palace Examination (dianshi 殿試)
690		Wu Zetian declares herself emperor of the Zhou dynasty in Luoyang
690		Tibetan Empire defeats a Tang army at Issyk-Kul
692		Tang forces reconquer the Four Garrisons of Anxi from Tibetan Empire
693		Qapaghan Qaghan of the Second Turkic Khaganate conducts raids against the Tang dynasty
693		Commoners and gentry from non-elite backgrounds are permitted to take the imperial examinations.
694		Tibetan Empire attacks the Stone City (Charklik).
694		Qapaghan Qaghan of the Second Turkic Khaganate conducts raids against Tang
696		Qapaghan Qaghan of the Second Turkic Khaganate defeats the Khitans to the east and raids Tang
696		Li Jinzhong (Mushang Khan) of the Khitans along with his brother-in-law Sun Wanrong revolt against Tang hegemony and attack Hebei; Li dies soon after and Sun succeeds him
696		Tibetan Empire defeats a Tang army at Tao Prefecture and attacks Liang Prefecture
697		The Zhang brothers Yizhi and Changzong are admitted into the palace to attend on Wu Zetian
697		Qapaghan Qaghan of the Second Turkic Khaganate defeats the Khitans and conducts raids against Tang
698		Battle of Tianmenling: Dae Jo-yeong's Goguryeo remnants and Mohe people defeat Tang forces
698		Dae Jo-yeong establishes the state of Jin (震) in northern Korea, later renamed Balhae (渤海) in 712
698		Qapaghan Qaghan of the Second Turkic Khaganate conducts raids against the Tang dynasty
699		Ko Tŏngmu rebels and creates Lesser Goguryeo; the Protectorate General to Pacify the East is moved to Pingzhou, in modern Lulong County

== 8th century ==
=== 700s ===
Year	Date	Event
700		Tridu Songtsen of the Tibetan Empire attacks He and Liang prefectures
701		Tridu Songtsen of the Tibetan Empire allies with Turks and attacks Liang, Song, and Tao prefectures
702		Qapaghan Qaghan of the Second Turkic Khaganate conducts raids against the Tang dynasty
702		Tibetan Empire attacks Mao Prefecture
702		Military examinations are introduced to recruit new officers as a response to the breakdown of the fubing system.
705	23 February	Zhang Jianzhi kills the Zhang brothers in a coup and restores the Tang with Emperor Zhongzong of Tang as emperor (Shenlong Coup); Wu Zetian dies from illness not long after
705		The earliest known printed text created specifically for reading, the Lotus Sutra, is dated to this year
706		Qapaghan Qaghan of the Second Turkic Khaganate conducts raids against the Tang dynasty
707		Crown Prince Li Chongjun starts a coup in which he kills Wu Sansi and assaults the palace; the coup fails and he is killed by his own soldiers while fleeing
707		Qapaghan Qaghan of the Second Turkic Khaganate conducts raids against Tang
708		Turgesh attacked Qiuci
708		Peroz III arrives back at the Tang court

=== 710s ===
Year	Date	Event
710	3 July	Emperor Zhongzong of Tang is poisoned to death by Empress Wei (his second wife), and Princess Anle, their daughter; Emperor Zhongzong of Tang's youngest son Emperor Shang of Tang succeeds the throne
710	25 July	Emperor Gaozong of Tang's daughter Princess Taiping instigates a coup and grandson Li Longji kills Empress Wei; Emperor Shang of Tang is replaced by Emperor Ruizong of Tang
710		Princess Jincheng, a great-granddaughter of Emperor Gaozong of Tang, is sent to Tibet as a bride; the Tibetans are granted Jiuqu (九曲), the land north of the Yellow River in Gansu by Emperor Ruizong of Tang
710		Zhang Xuanbiao of the Tang dynasty invades northeastern Tibet
711		The post of jiedushi is created
712	8 September	Emperor Ruizong of Tang abdicates in favor of his son Li Longji (Emperor Xuanzong of Tang)
712		Jin renames itself Balhae
713		Princess Taiping is ordered to kill herself after her failed attempt to unseat Emperor Xuanzong of Tang
713		Construction begins on the Leshan Giant Buddha
714		Tibetan Empire attacks Lintao and Weiyuan as well as Lan and Wei prefectures, but ultimately suffer a major defeat and are repelled
715		Zhang Xiaosong (張孝嵩) assists Fergana (Bahanna 拔汗那) in repulsing attacks by Tibetans and Arabs
715		Tibetan Empire attacks the Beiting Protectorate and Song Prefecture
716		Khitans break alliance with the Turks and ally with Tang
717		Battle of Aksu (717): Turgesh, Arabs, and Tibetan Empire attacks Gumo and the Stone City.
717		A Tibetan army was defeated by Guo Zhiyun at the "Bends of the Yellow River"
719		Turgesh captures Suiye

=== 720s ===
Year	Date	Event
720		Bilge Khagan of the Second Turkic Khaganate invades the Tang dynasty and extracts tribute
720		The governor-general of Ying Prefecture sends 500 Tang soldiers to interfere in Khitan conflicts but is defeated
720		Tibetan Empire seizes the Stone City
720		Tang bestows titles on the kings of Oddiyana, Khuttal, and Chitral
722		Tang assists Lesser Bolü (小勃律, a city state centering modern Gilgit, Pakistan, in Kashmir) in repulsing advancing Tibetan troops
722		Mai Thúc Loan rebels in Annan and is defeated
723		Princess Jincheng writes to Lalitaditya Muktapida of the Karkoṭa Empire asking for asylum. In response he contacts Zabulistan and forms an alliance against the Tibetan Empire.
724		Wang Junchuo launches an attack on the Tibetan Empire and scores a victory
725		The king of Khotan rebels but is immediately replaced with a Tang puppet by the Anxi Protectorate
726		Turgesh attacks Qiuci
726		Stag sgra khon lod of the Tibetan Empire attacks Gan Prefecture but most of their forces die in a snowstorm and the rest are mopped up by Wang Junchuo
727		Stag sgra khon lod and Cog ro Manporje of the Tibetan Empire and the Turgesh attack Qiuci and Gua Prefecture
728		Tibetan Empire attacks Qiuci
729		Zhang Shougui (張守珪) inflicts a major defeat on the Tibetan Empire at Xining

=== 730s ===
Year	Date	Event
730		Ketuyu of the Khitans attacks Tang
732		Tang forces inflict heavy casualties on the Khitans and Kumo Xi
733		A Tang-Kumo Xi army attacks a Turk-Khitan army
734		Tang and Tibetan Empire demarcate their territory Chiling Mountain with a boundary tablet
734		Zhang Shougui defeats Khitan forces in Youzhou (Hebei)
735		Turgesh attack Ting Prefecture.
736		An Lushan attacks the Khitans but is defeated
737		Piluoge (皮羅閣) unites the six zhaos (kingdoms) with Tang support
737		Hexi jiedushi Cui Xiyi makes a covenant with the Tibetan general in Koko-nor, Yilishu, to relax border defenses so their soldiers can engage in agriculture and animal husbandry. A white dog is sacrificed to seal the covenant.
738		Tang captures and loses Anrong to the Tibetan Empire
739		Tang scores a major victory against the Tibetan Empire at Shan Prefecture
739		The Tang Institutions of Six Administrative Divisions (Tang Liudian 唐六典) is completed

=== 740s ===
Year	Date	Event
740		Tang captures Anrong from the Tibetan Empire
740		An Lushan attacks the Khitans
741		Tibetan Empire attacks Tang in the Qinghai region but is repelled; the Tibetans sack the Stone City on their way back
742		Huangfu Weiming of Longyou and Wang Chui of Hexi invade northeastern Tibet and kill several thousand Tibetans
743		Tang recovers the Jiuqu (九曲) area from the Tibetan Empire
743		The Protectorate General to Pacify the East is relocated to the Old City of Liaoxi, possibly Ying Prefecture (modern Chaoyang, Liaoning.
745		Tibetan Empire defeats a Tang army at the Stone City
745		Two Khitan tribes revolt and are defeated by An Lushan
747		Gao Xianzhi marches across the Pamirs with 10,000 men and conquers Little Balur (Gilgit), a client state of the Tibetan Empire
748		Tang constructs a fortress on an island on the Qinghai Lake, pacifying the northern Qinghai region
748		Tang recaptures Suyab and destroys it
749		The fubing system is all but abolished
749		Longyou defense command under Geshu Han attacks Tibetan Empire and retakes the Stone City but suffers heavy casualties

=== 750s ===
Year	Date	Event
750		Tang defeats the Turgesh-Chach and executes the king of Chach
750		Chinese cultural dominance in Liaoning disappears and is replaced by Khitan culture
751		Battle of Talas: Tang forces are defeated by Arabs
751		Xianyu Zhongtong attacks Nanzhao with an army of 80,000 but is utterly defeated, losing three quarters of his original force
752		An Lushan attacks the Khitans
753		Geshu Han ejects the Tibetans from the "Nine Bends" region on the upper course of the Yellow River
754		Yang Guozhong invades Nanzhao but fails to engage with the enemy until supplies ran out, at which time they were attacked and routed
754		Monk Jianzhen arrives in Japan and establishes the Risshū (Buddhism) sect in Nara
755		An Lushan Rebellion: An Lushan rebels and declares himself emperor of Yan
756	spring	Battle of Yongqiu: Yan forces retreat from their siege of a Tang fortress
756	12 August	Emperor Xuanzong of Tang flees Chang'an. On his way to Sichuan, he is forced to order the death of his favorite consort Yang Guifei and abdicates in favor of Emperor Suzong of Tang
756		The Taoist Mao Kua reports in his Pinglongren (Recognition of the Recumbent Dragon) that by heating saltpeter, the yin of the air can be obtained, which combines with sulphur, carbon, and metals other than gold.
757		An Lushan is killed by his son An Qingxu
757		Battle of Suiyang: Yan forces emerge victorious with great losses
757		Tang counterattack under Guo Ziyi and Uyghur allies evict the Yan from Chang'an and Luoyang
757		An Qingxu flees across the Yellow River to southern Hebei
757		Tibetan Empire conquers Shan Prefecture
758		Princess Ningguo, second daughter of Emperor Suzong of Tang, marries Bayanchur Khan of the Uyghur Khaganate
759		An Qingxu is killed by rebel Shi Siming
759		Shi Siming occupies Luoyang
759		Jianzhen founds the Tōshōdai-ji in Nara, Japan

=== 760s ===
Year	Date	Event
760		Yangzhou massacre: Troops under Tian Shengong slaughter Arab and Persian merchants in Yangzhou
760		Lu Yu (730s-circa 804) composes The Classic of Tea
761		Shi Siming is killed by his son Shi Chaoyi
761		The Protectorate General to Pacify the East is abolished
762	3 May	Emperor Xuanzong of Tang dies from depression
762	16 May	Emperor Suzong of Tang dies of a heart attack
762	18 May	Emperor Daizong of Tang ascends the throne
762		Tang army and Uyghur allies defeat Shi Chaoyi's army and retake Luoyang; both Tang soldiers and Uyghurs loot the city
763		An Lushan Rebellion: Shi Chaoyi commits suicide and the An Lushan Rebellion ends
763		Tibetan Empire invades the Tang dynasty with an army of 100 000 and briefly occupies Chang'an for 15 days before retreating
763		Tibetan Empire conquers Yanqi
764	5 January	Yan Wu (嚴武) is made jiedushi of Jiannan
764	Fall	Tibetan Empire invades the Tang dynasty with a 70 000 strong army and takes Liang Prefecture but is repulsed by Yan Wu in Jiannan
765		Tibetan Empire invades the Tang dynasty with 30 000 troops and Uyghur allies, advancing as far as Fengtian twice but are repulsed by Guo Ziyi, who convinced the Uyghurs to switch sides
766		Tibetan Empire conquers Gan and Su prefectures.
767		Sea people invade Annan and are defeated

=== 770s ===
Year	Date	Event
776		Tibetan Empire conquers Gua Prefecture.
779	10 June	Emperor Daizong of Tang dies from illness; Emperor Dezong of Tang succeeds him

=== 780s ===
Year	Date	Event
780		A group of Uyghurs and Sogdians are killed while leaving Chang'an with tribute. The Tang agree to 1,800,000 strings of cash in compensation.
780		The dual tax system is implemented
781		Tibetan Empire conquers Yi Prefecture.
781		Guo Ziyi dies
782		Wang Wujun of Chengde and Zhu Tao of Lulong join Tian Yue of Weibo in rebellion against Tang
783		Tibetan Empire and Tang sign the Treaty of Qinshui, ending further hostilities
783		Li Xilie of Huaixi (south Henan) rebels
783		Emperor Dezong of Tang imposes housing and cash transaction taxes
783		Troops at Jing Prefecture mutiny in Chang'an and set up Zhu Ci as emperor
783		Emperor Dezong of Tang flees to Fengtian (奉天, in modern Xianyang)
784		Emperor Dezong of Tang pardons Tian Yue et al.
784		Li Huaiguang of Shuofang rebels
784		Tibetan Empire aids Tang in crushing Zhu Ci's rebellion in return for ownership of the Anxi Protectorate and Beiting Protectorate
784		Li Sheng retakes Chang'an
784		Zhu Ci is killed
784		Tang breaks their promise to cede their protectorates to the Tibetan Empire and as a result the Treaty of Qingshui is annulled
785		Phùng Hưng rebels in Annan
786		Warlord Li Xilie is killed
786		Tibetan Empire conquers Yan and Xia prefectures
787		Tibetan Empire double crosses Tang at the Treaty of Pingliang and captures many of the Tang officials and military leaders present
787		Tibetan Empire destroys Yan and Xia prefectures before abandoning them
787		Tibetan Empire captures Sha Prefecture and Qiuci
788		Tang defeats the Tibetan Empire at Xi Prefecture
788		Princess Xian'an, eighth daughter of Emperor Dezong of Tang, marries Alp qutlugh bilge of the Uyghur Khaganate
789		Tibetan Empire attacks Long, Jing, and Bing prefectures

=== 790s ===
Year	Date	Event
790		Tibetan Empire conquers Ting Prefecture
791		Tang regains control of Annan
792		Tibetan Empire conquers Xi Prefecture and Yutian
793		Tang general Wei Gao destroys 50 Tibetan strongholds and defeats a 30,000 strong Tibetan army, recovering Yan Prefecture
796		Tibetan Empire attacks Qing Prefecture but the campaign abruptly ends when chief minister Nanam Shang Gyaltsen Lhanang dies

== 9th century ==
=== 800s ===
Year	Date	Event
801		Tang and Nanzhao defeat Tibetan Empire and their Abbasid slave soldiers
803		Tang pushes the western border forward to Pingliang
803		Champa seizes southern Annan
803		The Leshan Giant Buddha is completed
804		Merchants start using paper notes known as flying cash as a credit medium
804		Kukai visits China
805	25 February	Emperor Dezong of Tang dies; his son Li Song succeeds him and becomes Emperor Shunzong of Tang, who abdicates in favor of his son Li Chun, who becomes Emperor Xianzong of Tang
805		Wang Shuwen makes a failed attempt to take back military power from the eunuchs
806		Emperor Xianzong of Tang pacifies military commanders in Jiannan and the lower Yangzi region
806		Kukai returns to Japan
808		The Chuy branch of Shatuo Turks are defeated by the Tibetan Empire and move to Inner China
808		First confirmed reference to gunpowder appears in the Taishang Shengzu Jindan Mijue
809		Emperor Xianzong of Tang attacks Chengde but fails

=== 810s ===
Year	Date	Event
812		The Tang government takes over the merchant institution of using flying cash for the purpose of forwarding local taxes and revenues to the capital
814		Wu Yuanji rebels in Huaixi (south Henan)
817		Wu Yuanji is captured and killed
819		Tibetan Empire attacks Qing Prefecture

=== 820s ===
Year	Date	Event
820	14 February	Emperor Xianzong of Tang dies, probably from being poisoned by eunuchs; his son Li Heng succeeds him and becomes Emperor Muzong of Tang
820		Dương Thanh rebels and seizes Đại La
821		Tang and the Tibetan Empire sign a treaty of non-aggression with the Tang recognizing Tibet's ownership of the Western Regions as well as the Longyou and Hexi regions in what is now Gansu Province
821		Tibetan Empire attacks Tang but are driven off by the governor of Yan Prefecture
821		Princess Taihe, 17th daughter of Emperor Xianzong of Tang, marries Kün tengride ülüg bulmïsh alp küchlüg bilge of the Uyghur Khaganate
822		The Uyghurs send troops to help the Tang fight against rebels, but their aid is refused; the Tang pay them 70,000 pieces of silk to go home.
823		The Tang-Bo huimeng bei (Stele of the Tang-Tibetan alliance) is set up in Lhasa
824	25 February	Emperor Muzong of Tang dies; his son Li Zhan succeeds him and becomes Emperor Jingzong of Tang
827	9 January	Emperor Jingzong of Tang is killed by eunuchs; his brother Li Ang succeeds him and becomes Emperor Wenzong of Tang
829		Nanzhao takes Chengdu and captures 20,000 Chinese engineers

=== 830s ===
Year	Date	Event
835		Sweet Dew Incident: Li Zhongyan and others are killed after a failed attempt to eliminate the eunuchs
835		Tang court forbids privately printed calendars
837		Tang regains control of Đại La
838		Japanese monk Ennin visits China

=== 840s ===
Year	Date	Event
840	10 February	Emperor Wenzong of Tang dies; his brother Li Chan is placed on the throne by eunuchs and becomes Emperor Wuzong of Tang
840		Uyghur Khaganate enters decline in the aftermath of civil war
842		Tibetan Empire enters decline after the death of Dharma
843		A Tang army led by Shi Xiong attacks the Uyghurs displaced by the fall of their khaganate and slaughters 10,000 Uyghurs at "Kill the Foreigners" Mountain (Shahu)
843		Proscription against foreign religions begins, starting with Manichaeism
844		Zhaoyi defense command (mainly in south Shanxi) is brought under control
845		Great Anti-Buddhist Persecution: Emperor Wuzong of Tang instigates the third and largest proscription campaign against Buddhism in Chinese history; Zoroastrianism and Manichaeism are also targeted
846	22 April	Emperor Wuzong of Tang dies, probably from taking pills made by alchemists; his uncle Li Chen is placed on the throne by eunuchs and becomes Emperor Xuānzong of Tang
846		Nanzhao raids Annan
846		Ban on Buddhism is partially lifted
847		Tang defeats a Tibetan army at Yan Prefecture
847		Ban on Buddhism is completely lifted
847		Japanese monk Ennin leaves for Japan
848		Zhang Yichao, a resident of Sha Prefecture, rebels and captures Sha and Gua prefectures from the Tibetans
849		Tibetan commanders and soldiers in east Gansu defect to the Tang

=== 850s ===
Year	Date	Event
850		Zhang Yichao captures Gan, Su, and Yi prefectures and submits a petition to Emperor Xuānzong of Tang, offering his loyalty and submission
851		Zhang Yichao captures Xi Prefecture and the Tang emperor makes him Guiyi Jiedushi (歸義節度使, Governor of the Guiyi Circuit) and Cao Yijin his secretary general
851		An Arab traveler records the use of toilet paper in China.
853		Duan Chengshi publishes the Miscellaneous Morsels from Youyang, a text on Chinese and foreign folklore and legends; it contains the Ye Xian, an early version of the story of Cinderella
858		Rebellion breaks out in Annan and is put down
858		A flood along the Grand Canal and on the North China Plain kills tens of thousands
858		Taoist text Zhenyuan miaodao yaolüe mentions the dangers of "fire medicine" (gunpowder)
859	7 September	Emperor Xuānzong of Tang dies; eunuchs place his son Li Wen on the throne and becomes Emperor Yizong of Tang

=== 860s ===
Year	Date	Event
860		The Qiu Fu Uprising in Zhejiang is suppressed
861		Nanzhao attacks Bo Prefecture and Annan but is repulsed.
861		Zhang Yichao retakes Liang Prefecture, extending the Guiyi Circuit's authority to Xi, Gua, Gan, Su, Yi, Lan, Shan, He, Min, Liang, and Kuo prefectures
863		Nanzhao conquers Annan
866		Zhang Yichao defeats bLon Khrom brZhe and seizes Ting Prefecture and Luntai but immediately loses them as well as Xi Prefecture to the Kingdom of Qocho
866		Tibetans retreat to the Tibetan Plateau
866		Gao Pian retakes Annan from Nanzhao
868		Headed by Pang Xun, Guizhou garrison troops mutiny and move north
868		The oldest text containing a date of printing, the Diamond Sutra, is printed
869		Pang Xun is defeated by Shatuo cavalry under Zhuye Chixin and dies
869		Kingdom of Qocho attacks the Guiyi Circuit but fails
869		Nanzhao lays siege to Chengdu but fails to capture it

=== 870s ===
Year	Date	Event
870		Nanzhao lays siege to Chengdu (in Sichuan)
870		Kingdom of Qocho attacks the Guiyi Circuit but fails
873	15 August	Emperor Yizong of Tang becomes critically ill and dies; his son Li Yan is enthroned by eunuchs and becomes Emperor Xizong of Tang
874		Wang Xianzhi rebels in Changyuan (in Henan)
875		Huang Chao joins Wang Xianzhi in the rebellion
876		Kingdom of Qocho conquers Yi Prefecture
877		Nanzhao retreats from Qianzhong Circuit in modern Guizhou
877		Earliest known printed almanac, the Qianfu sinian lishu (乾符四年曆書), is dated to this year
878		Wang Xianzhi dies; Huang Chao takes over
879		Guangzhou Massacre: Huang Chao sacks Guangzhou (in Guangdong) and heads north

=== 880s ===
Year	Date	Event
880		Huang Chao sacks Luoyang
880		Zeng Gun withdraws Tang troops from the south and relinquishes control over Annan
881		Huang Chao occupies Chang'an; Emperor Xizong of Tang flees to Chengdu
881		Gan and Liang prefectures become independent
882		Zhu Wen, Huang Chao's general, defects to Tang
883		Huang Chao flees from Chang'an
883		Printed books are on sale in the market of Chengdu
884		Huang Chao dies while being chased by Li Keyong
885		Emperor Xizong of Tang returns to Chang'an
885		Qin Zongquan declares himself emperor, sacks Luoyang, and leaves
885		Lu Guangchou and Tan Quanbo rebel and capture Qian prefecture in Jiangxi
886		Eunuch Tian Lingzi takes Emperor Xizong of Tang to Xingyuan (east of Hanzhong, Shaanxi) when Chang'an is threatened by Li Keyong and Wang Chongrong
886		Li Yun is set up as emperor by warlord Zhu Mei in Chang'an; both Yun and Mei are killed not long after
888	20 April	Emperor Xizong of Tang dies of illness; his brother Li Jie is enthroned by eunuchs and becomes Emperor Zhaozong of Tang

=== 890s ===
Year	Date	Event
890		Zhu Wen and Li Keyong engage in a number of battles against each other
891		Wang Jian enters Chengdu
891		Qian Liu enters Suzhou (in Jiangsu)
897		Liu Yin, the jiedushi of Qinghai Circuit (Guangzhou), defeated a rebellion against him
898		Liu Yin defeats the jiedushi Zeng Gun's attempt to seize his post

== 10th century ==
Year	Date	Event
900		Zhu Wen takes control of Hebei
900	1 December	Emperor Zhaozong of Tang is dethroned; his son Li Yu, Prince of De is set up as emperor by a eunuch
901		Emperor Zhaozong of Tang is restored and later forced by eunuchs to leave Chang'an for Fengxiang (in Shaanxi)
902		Zhu Wen names Yang Xingmi Prince of Wu and lays siege to Fengxiang
902		Lu Guangchou and Tan Quanbo expand and capture Shao prefecture in Hunan (placed under Lu Yanchang) and Chao prefecture in Guangdong (placed under Lu Guangmu)
903		Zhu Wen takes Emperor Zhaozong of Tang to Chang'an, where Zhu and Cui Yin carry out wholesale slaughter of the eunuchs
903		Wang Jian is created Prince of Shu
904		Zhu Wen kills Cui Yin and forces Emperor Zhaozong of Tang to leave Chang'an for Luoyang, where Zhaozong is killed
904		Emperor Ai of Tang is enthroned by Zhu Wen
904		First possible usage of gunpowder weapons (possibly fire arrows) by Wu (Ten Kingdoms) during the siege of Yuzhang
907		Khitan chieftain Abaoji becomes emperor of the Liao dynasty
907	12 May	Zhu Wen deposes Emperor Ai of Tang and establishes his Later Liang dynasty in Kaifeng (in Henan); so ends the Tang dynasty

== Gallery ==
Transition from Sui to Tang (613–628)

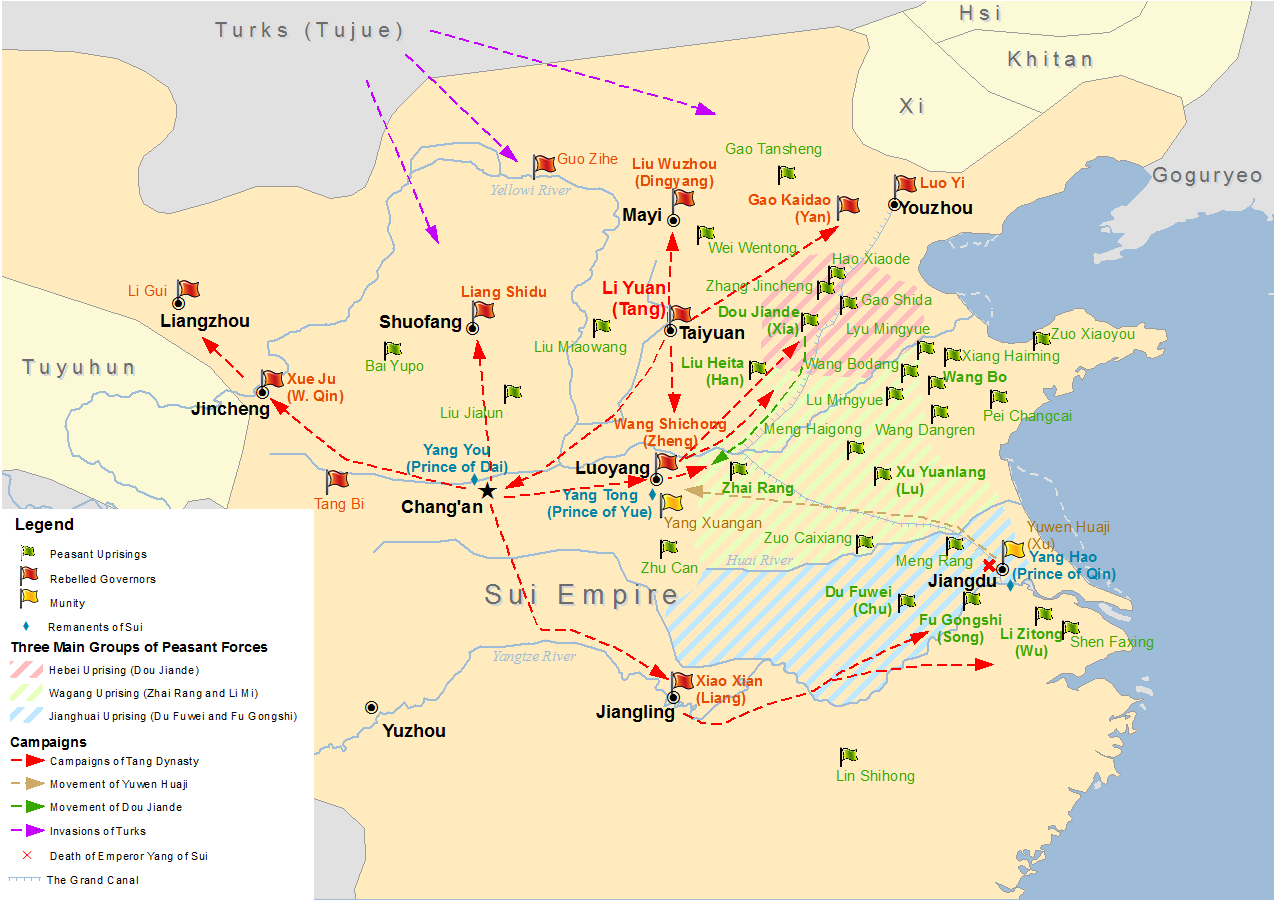
Transition from Sui to Tang (613–628)

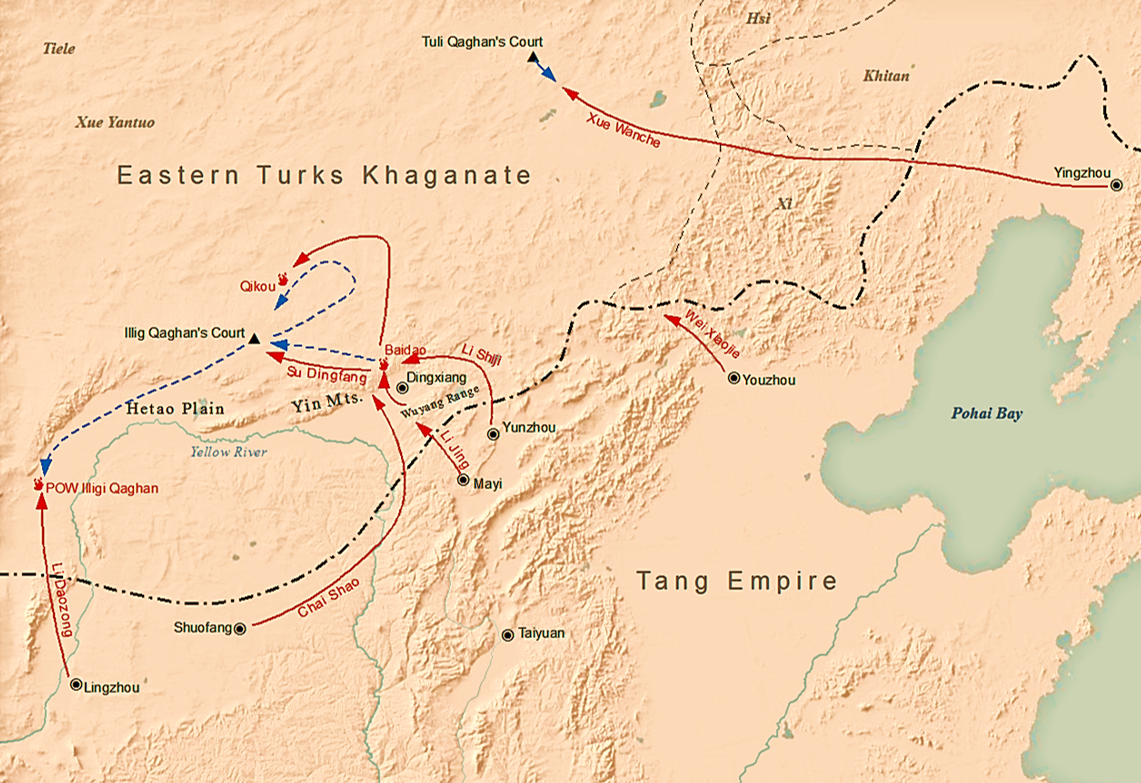
Tang campaign against the Eastern Turks (629–630)

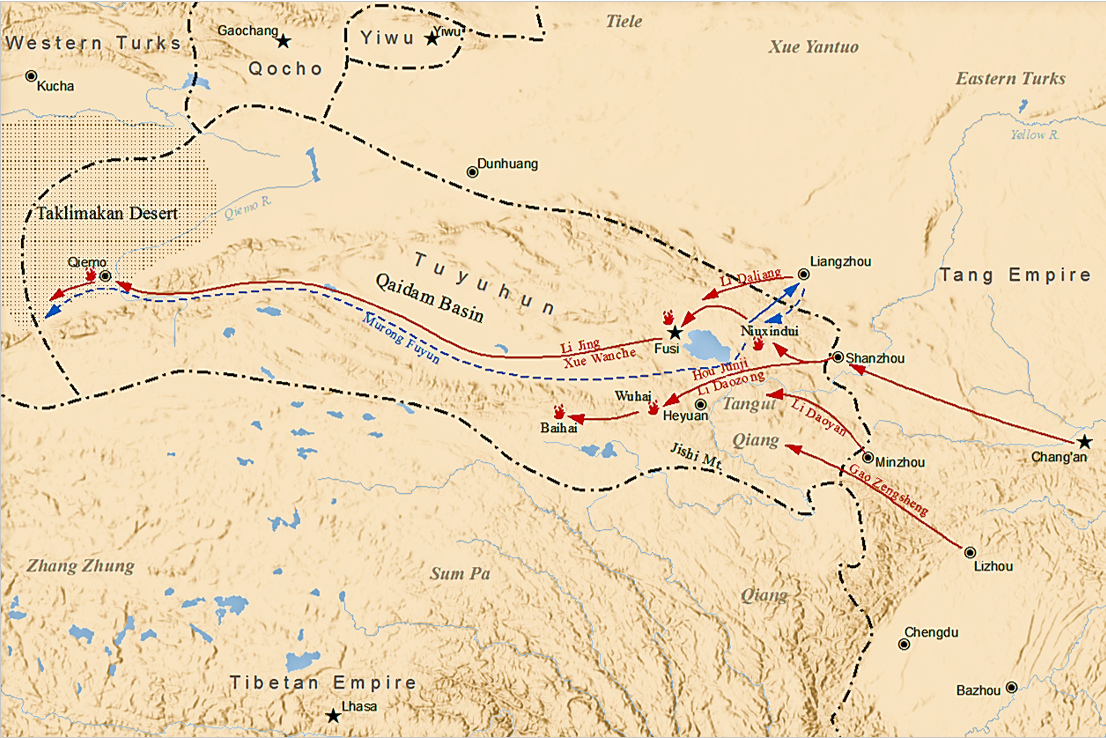
Emperor Taizong's campaign against Tuyuhun in 634

Emperor Taizong's campaign against the Western Regions (640–648)

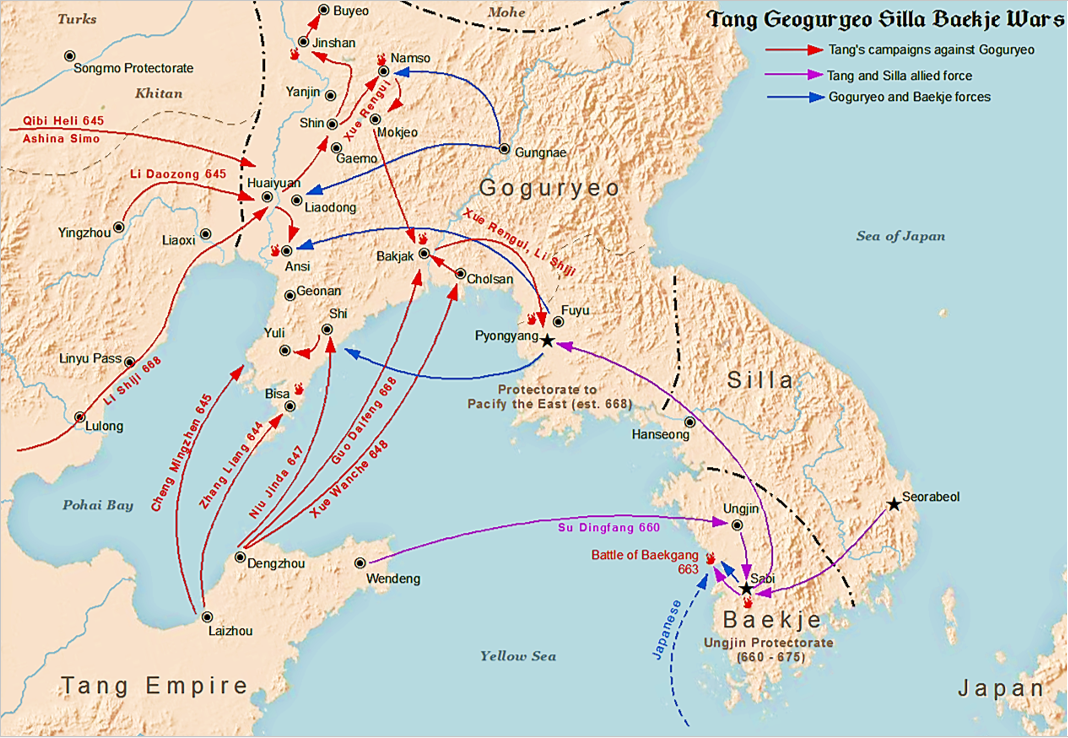
Goguryeo–Tang War (645–668)

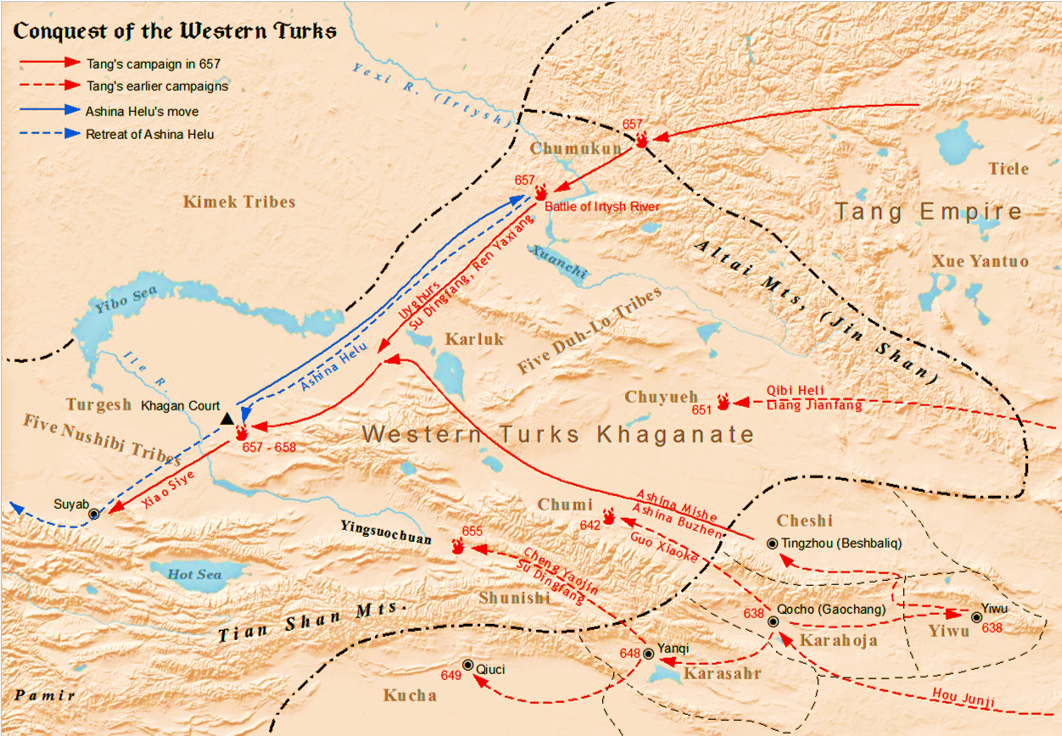
Conquest of the Western Turks in 657

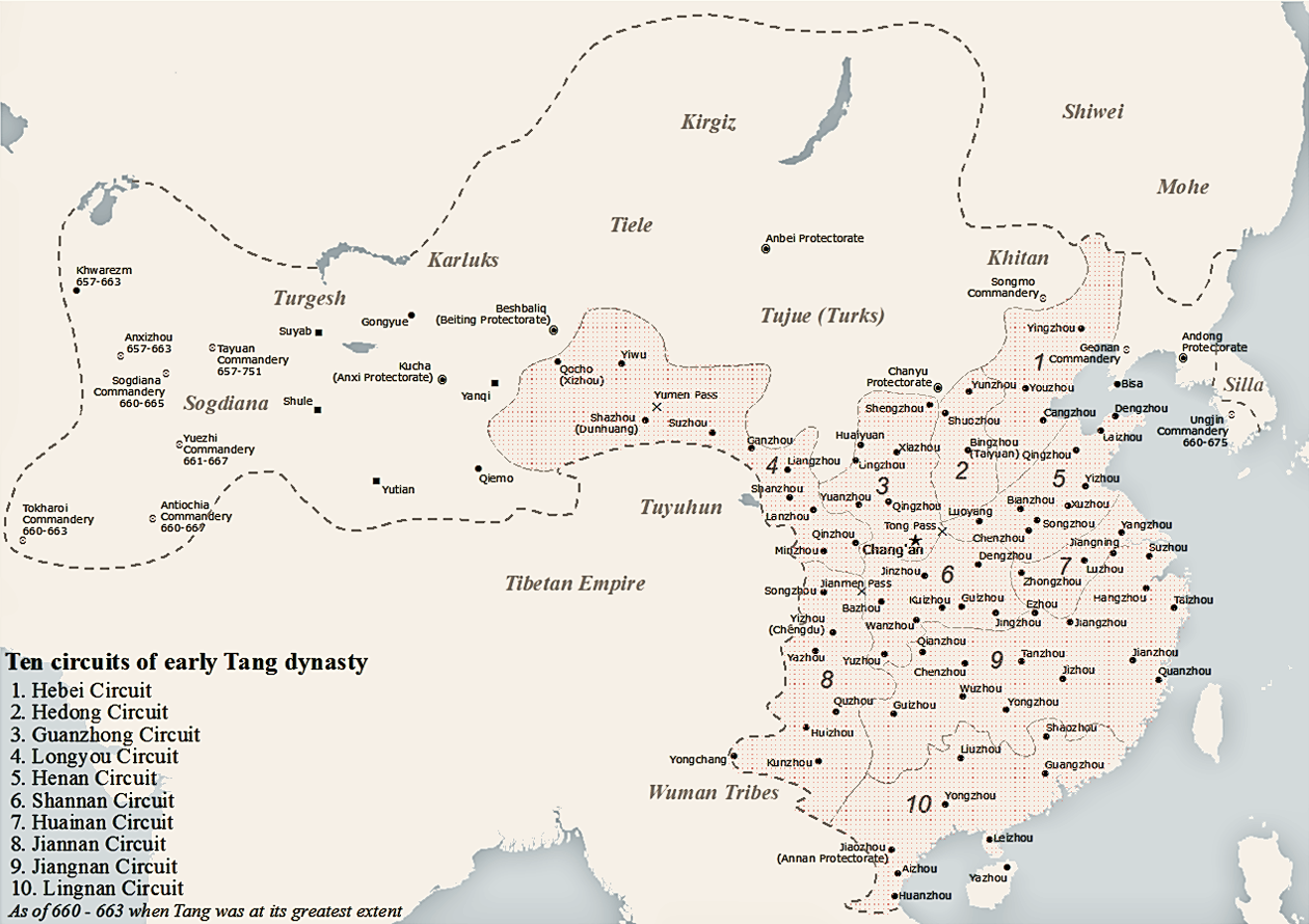
Tang dynasty in 660

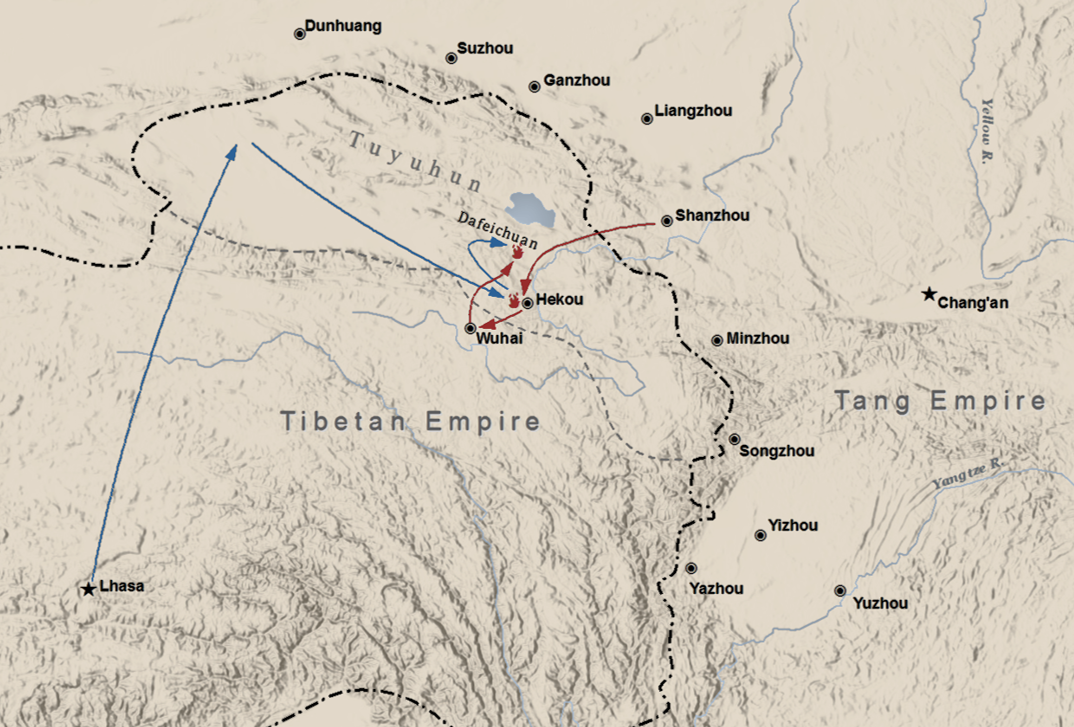
Battle of Dafei River in 670

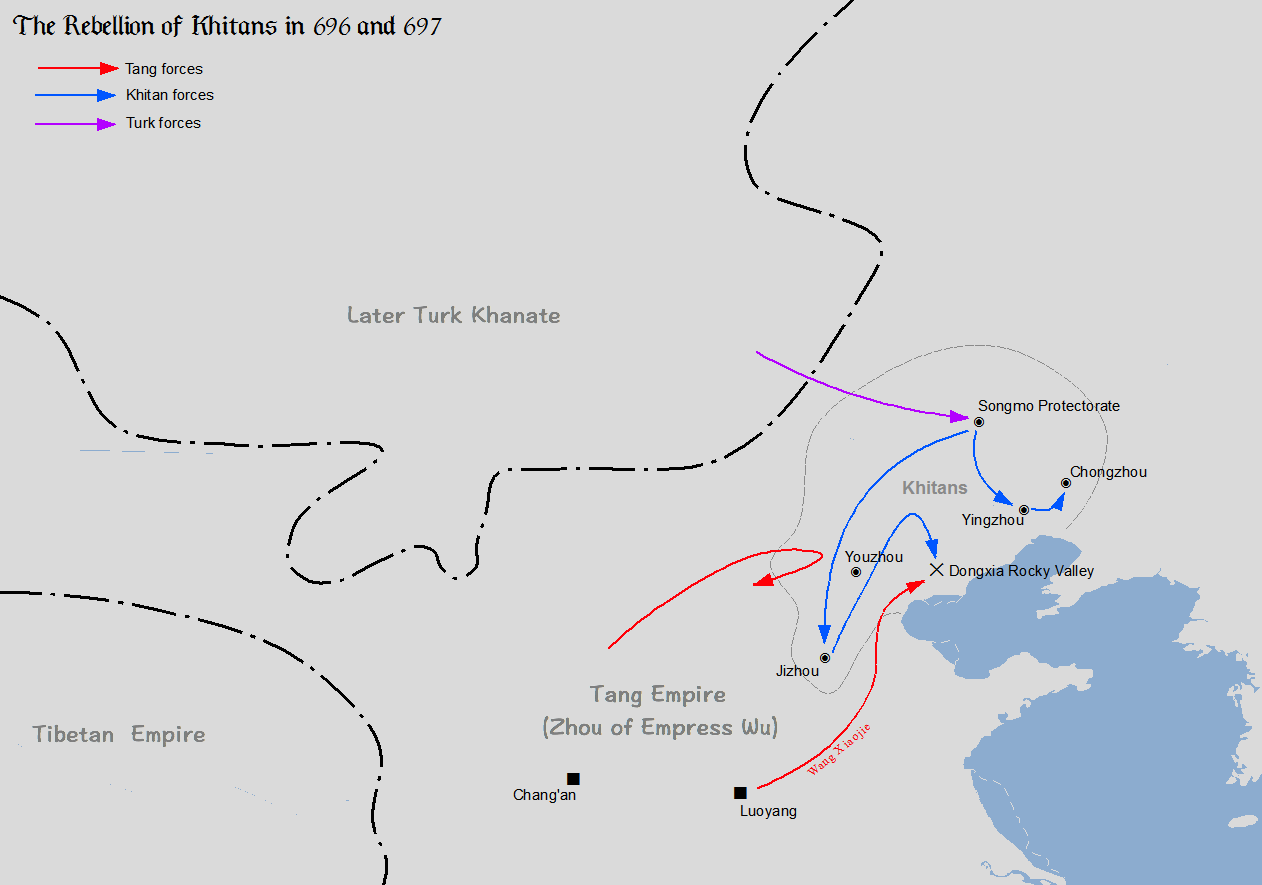
Rebellion of Li Jinzhong and Sun Wanrong in 696

Little Goguryeo (699–820)

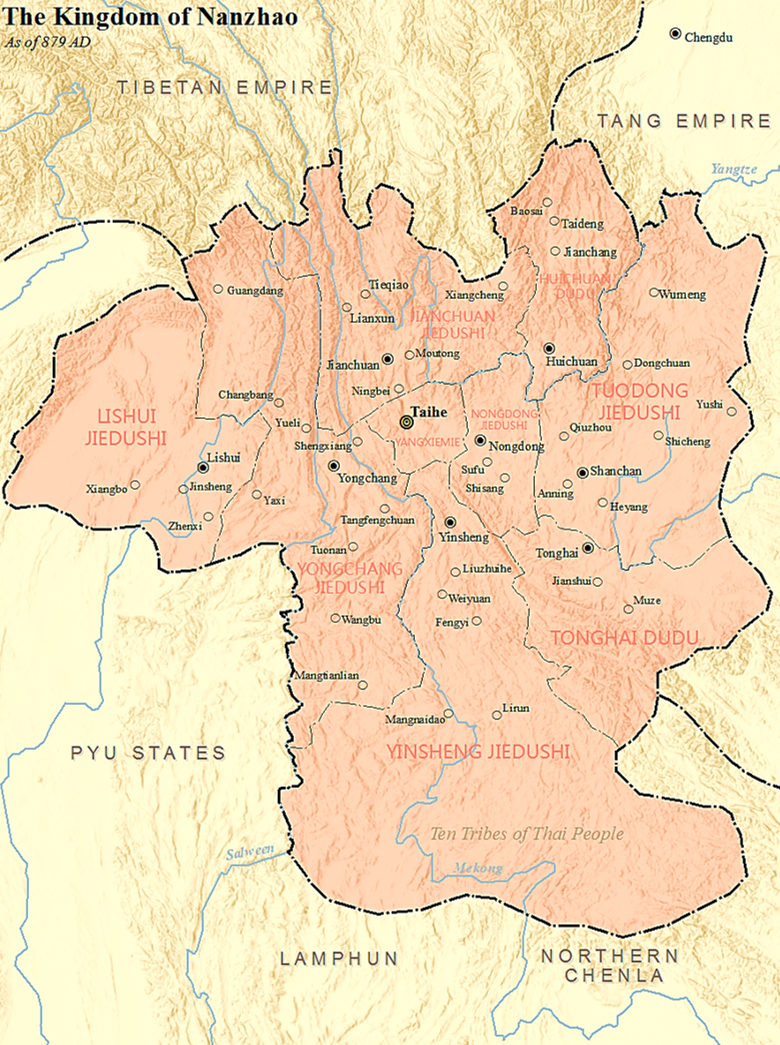
Nanzhao (738–937)

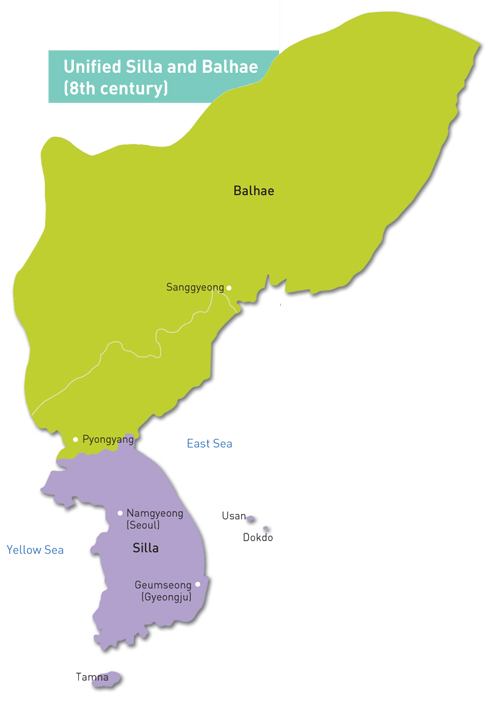
Unified Silla and Balhae in the 8th century

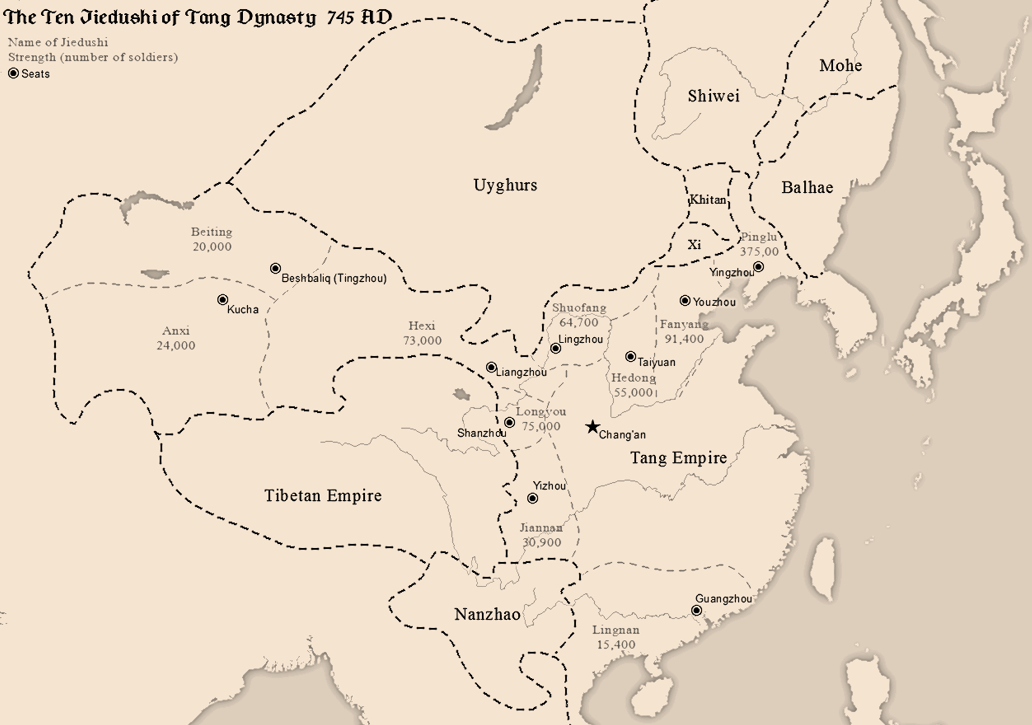
Major jiedushi in 745

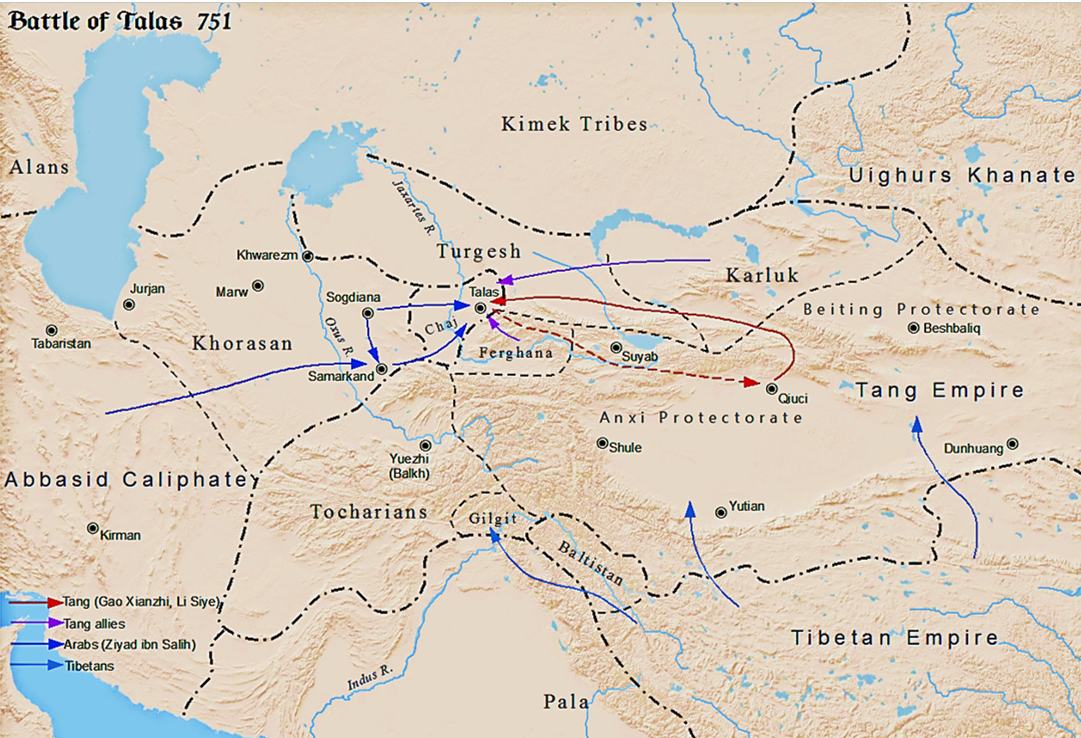
Battle of Talas in 751

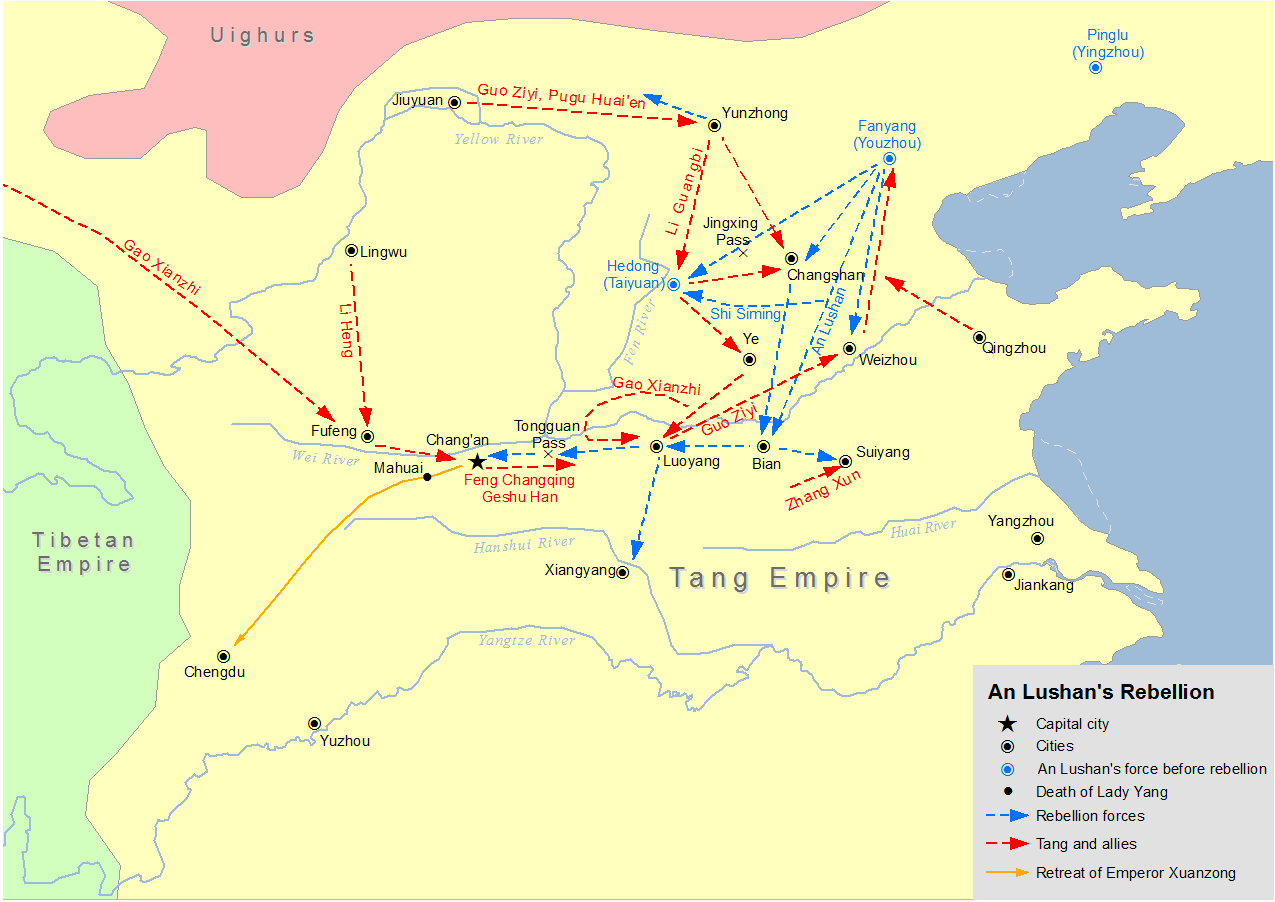
An Lushan Rebellion (755–763)

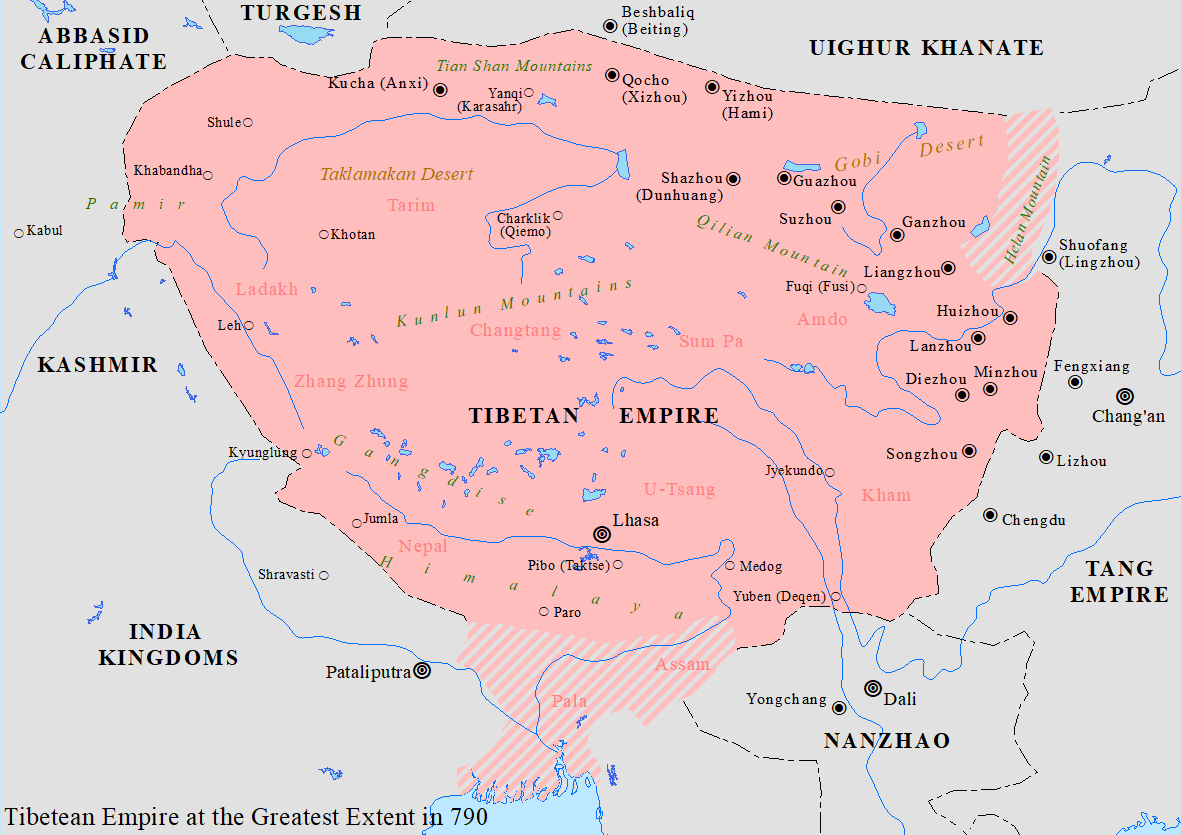
Tibetan Empire in 790

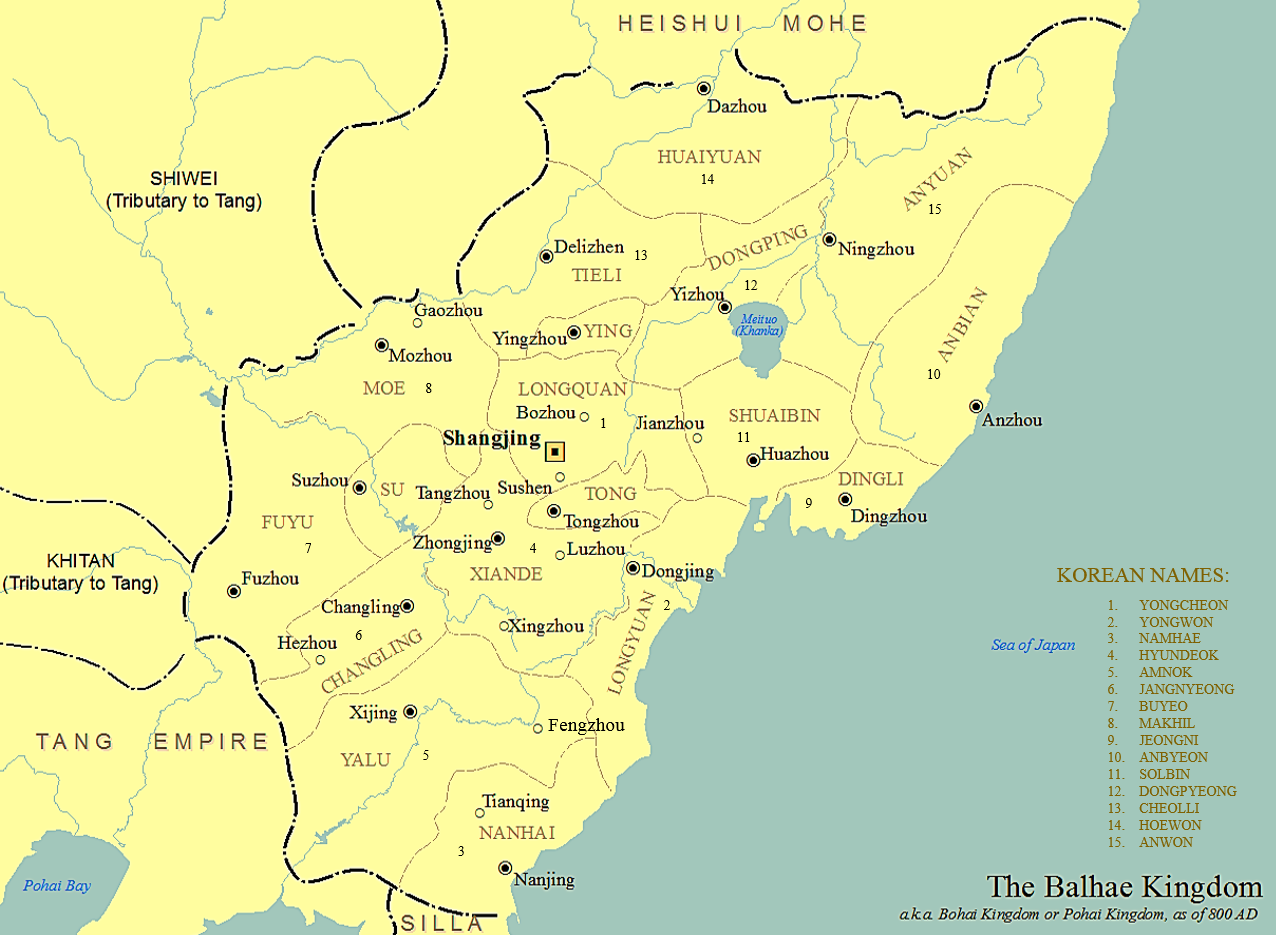
Balhae in 800

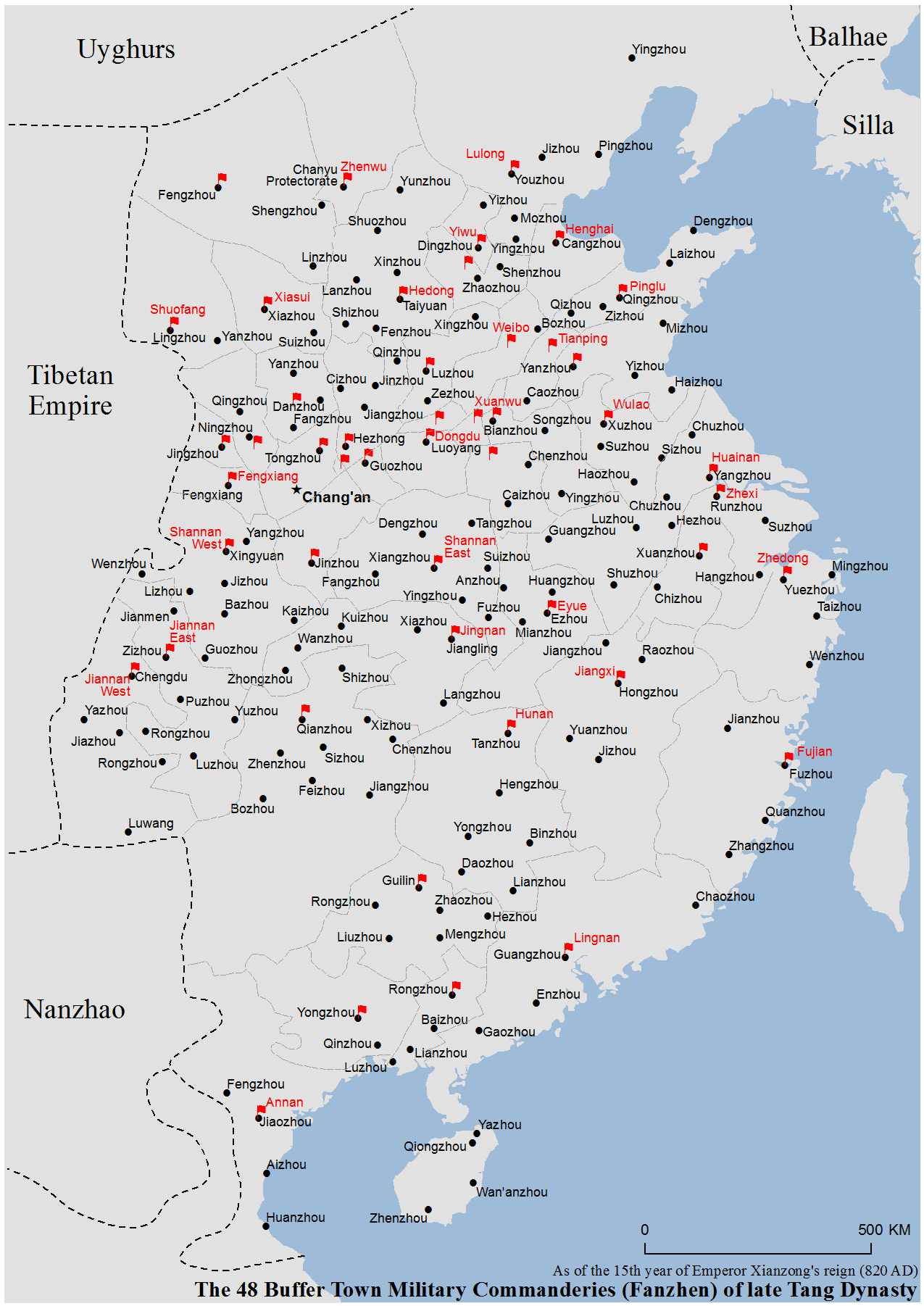
Tang dynasty in 820

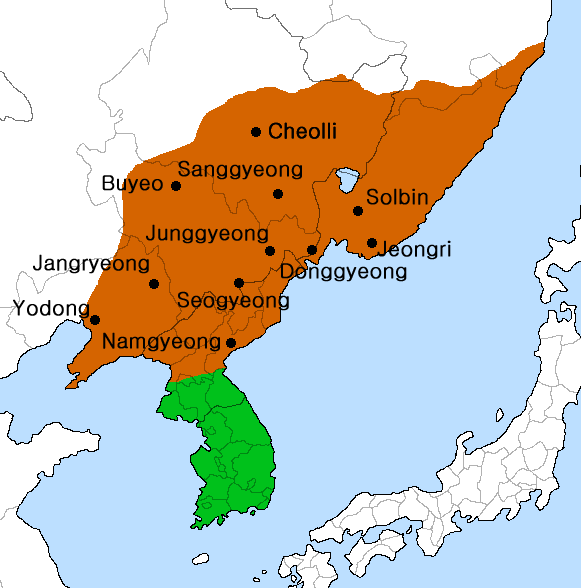
Balhae in 830

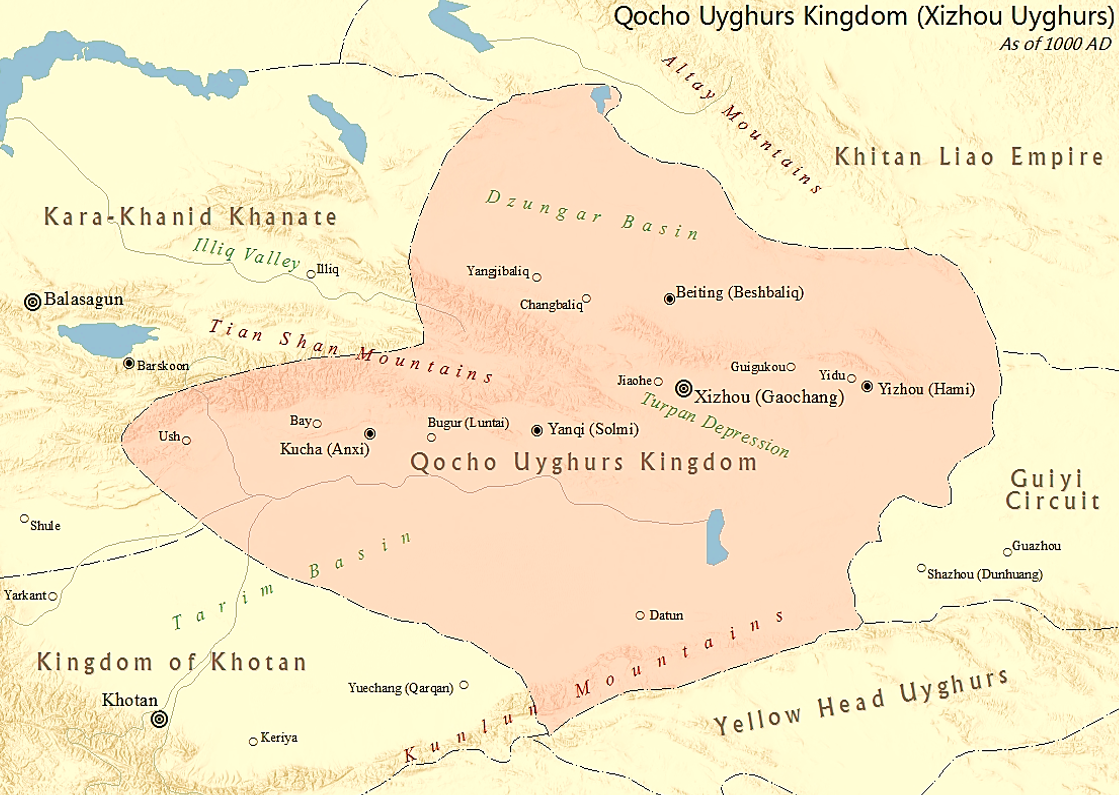
Qocho (843–1132)

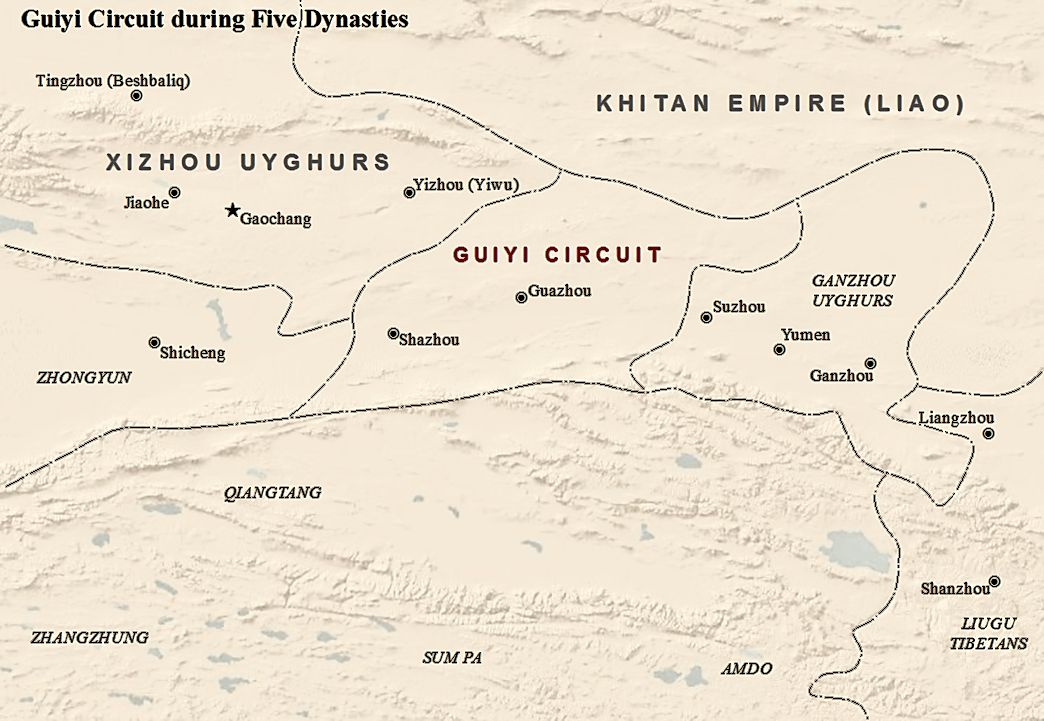
Guiyi Circuit (851–1036) and the Ganzhou Uyghur Kingdom (894–1036)

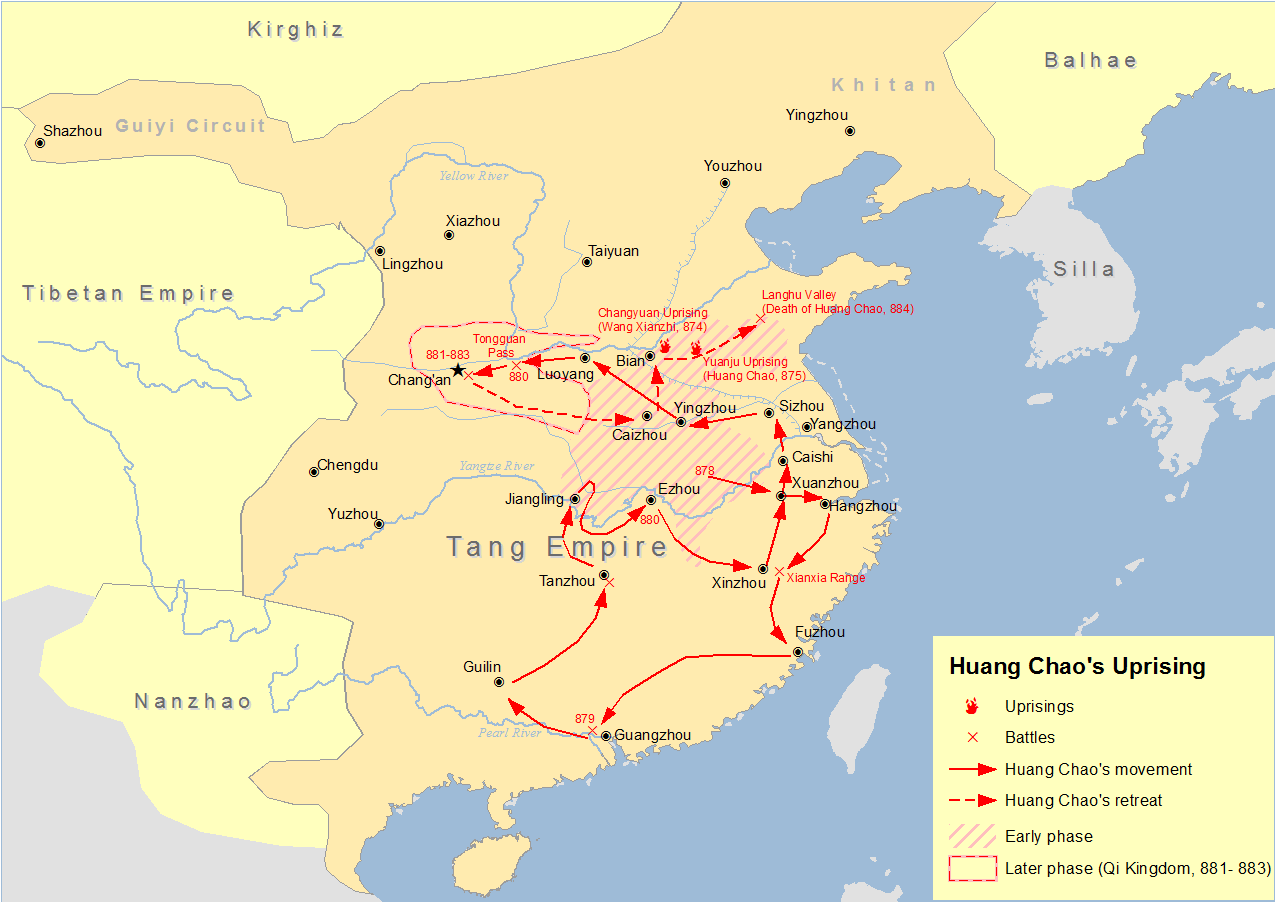
The uprisings of Wang Xianzhi and Huang Chao (874–884)

== See also ==
- Administrative divisions of the Tang dynasty
- Timeline of the Sui dynasty
- Timeline of the Khitans
- Timeline of the Five Dynasties and Ten Kingdoms
