= Li Shouli =

Prince of Bin 邠王
- Reign: 710–741

Hereditary Prince of Yong 嗣雍王
- Reign: 705–710
- Born: 672
- Died: 741 (aged 68–69)
- Issue: Princess Jincheng; Li Chenghong; Li Chengning; Li Chengcai Further information: § Offsprings
- Father: Prince Zhanghuai
- Mother: Lady Zhang

Lĭ Shǒulĭ (672–741) (simplified Chinese: 李守礼; traditional Chinese: 李守禮) was the second son of Li Xián, who was also known as Crown Prince Zhanghuai of Tang. Born Li Guangren (李光仁), during the Chuigong era of his youngest uncle Emperor Ruizong of Tang's reign when his grandmother Wu Zetian held the real power, he was renamed Shouli and given the post "Crown Prince Xima" (Taizi Xima 太子洗马). (Note: As the Quan Tang Wen was compiled during the Qing dynasty, earlier sources will also be quoted if possible.)

== Childhood ==
Li Guangren's father, Li Xián, as the heir apparent to his father Emperor Gaozong of Tang, was once created Crown Prince but failed in a power struggle against his ambitious mother Wu Zetian. He was deposed and exiled to Ba Prefecture with his family, and eventually was forced to commit suicide in 684. In 685, Wu Zetian restored Li Xián to his former title Prince of Yong and recalled his family back to the capital Chang'an, created Guangren Prince of Yong, appointed him as Taizi Xima and changed his name to Shouli. When Wu Zetian claimed imperial title, she bestowed Li Shouli as well as his elder brother Li Guangshun (李光顺), younger brother Li Shouyi (李守义) and sister Lady Changxin (长信郡主) her surname Wu. However, due to her resentment of Li Xián, Li Shouli and his siblings were all effectively under house arrest along with sons of Ruizong. Guangshun was executed, Shouyi also died early, and Lady Changxin disappeared into history. It was not until Ruizong was recreated Prince of Xiang that Shouli and his cousins were allowed to live outside the palaces. Shouli was appointed as Siyi Langzhong.

According to Confucian succession law, Shouli should have been the heir apparent of Wu Zetian; but as son of a deposed crown prince, he was effectively barred from the succession while Shouli's two younger uncles, Xiǎn (note different tone from that of Shouli's father Xián) and Dan (i.e. Emperor Ruizong), both younger sons of Wu Zetian, were still alive. Xiǎn, who had briefly reigned as Emperor Zhongzong of Tang in 684 before being deposed by Wu Zetian, would become her successor and start his second reign.

== As Royal Prince ==
When Emperor Zhongzong of Tang succeeded the throne for the second time in 705, Shouli was created Prince of Yong, a title formerly held by Li Xián, and appointed as Guangluqing. In 707, one of Shouli's daughters was created Princess of Jincheng and engaged to Kridê Zukzän the Lord of Tibet. They would marry in 710, the same year that Ruizong would start his second reign. According to the Will of Zhongzong, Ruizong created Li Shouli Prince of Bin (Note: Li Shouli's biography in New Book of Tang, and the Quan Tang Wen recorded that Shouli was made Prince of Bin in 710. But, Shouli's biography in the Old Book of Tang recorded that he was made Prince of Bin during the Shenlong era (705-707). Zhongzong's biography in Old Book of Tang and Ruizong's biography in New Book of Tang recorded that he was made Prince of Bin on the jiashen day of the 6th month of the 4th year of the Jinglong era/ 1st year of the Jingyun era, which corresponds to 5 Jul 710 in the Julian calendar. Thus, Shouli's biography in the Old Book of Tang likely recorded the wrong era name; the correct era name should be Jinglong.) and successively appointed him as governor of Youzhou, titular Chanyu Daduhu, Sikong (司空) and so on. Unlike his cousin-brothers, Shouli loved hunting, having parties, travelling and watching dances, and did not participate in governance. Sometime after 721, Emperor Xuanzong of Tang (Ruizong's son and successor) recalled Shouli to the capital Chang'an.

As a royal prince, Shouli was so mediocre and lacking in ability that he could never be compared with neither Li Fan (李范) nor Li Ye (李业) (both younger brothers of Xuanzong). Most of his sons were also mediocre, while most of his daughters were adulterous. In summary, Shouli was unworthy of acclaim. He himself was always extravagant and would deny beneficial advice by relying on his special position as the eldest living cousin brother of Xuanzong.

== Forecasting ability ==
Li Shouli was noted for his ability to forecast the weather. Sometimes it was dark, but Shouli managed to forecast that it would be sunny soon. Sometimes it was continuously hot for about ten days, Shouli also knew it would rain in advance. Li Fan reported this to Emperor Xuanzong, saying Shouli had a knowledge of the weather. When praised by the emperor, Li Shouli explained that it was actually a result of his unfortunate childhood rather than the result of any scholarly research into the weather. He had been always beaten while under house arrest and as a result a thick scar had formed on his back which would become heavy or light as the weather turned rainy or sunny. Li Shouli wept as he explained, gaining Emperor Xuanzong's sympathy. (Note: Translation of Shouli's words: "It was not my research. When Empress Wu was in power, my father was found guilty, and I was under house arrest in palaces for over ten years. During those times, I was beaten many times every year, now black and blue. So, when it was to rain, my back felt heavy; when it was to be sunny, my back felt light.")

== Offspring ==
Shouli died in 741 and was posthumously honored with the title Taiwei (太尉). He had many concubines, who bore him over 60 offspring. Among his sons, Li Chengning (李承寧), born by his consort, was his heir who would succeed him as the next Prince of Bin, while Li Chenghong, his eldest son born by his concubine, would briefly be created emperor by the Tibetans in November 763, though he reigned for no more than half a month. Li Chengcai (李承寀) would be created Prince of Dunhuang.

According to the New Book of Tang, names of some other sons of Shouli were also recorded, but they mostly served as officials rather than royal princes: Li Chengqian (李承骞), Li Chengyou (李承宥), Li Chenghuan (李承寰), Li Chengshi (李承寔), Li Chengshi (李承實), Li Chengcong (李承賨), Li Chengrong (李承容), Li Chengtu (李承突), Li Chengwei (李承寪), Chengjun (李承寯) and Li Chengkuan (李承寬).

Besides Princess Jincheng, the second daughter of Shouli was created Princess Huating, and another daughter titled Princess Jianning was married to Pang Jian (龐堅), an official and 4th-generation descendant of early Tang general Pang Yu (龐玉).
