= Lha of Tibet =

(Disputed) Tibetan King (697-?)

Lha Balpho ལྷ་བལ་ཕོ་
- Tsenpo

King of Tibet
- Reign: c. 704 – 705
- Predecessor: Tridu Songtsen
- Successor: Tridé Tsuktsen
- Born: c. 697
- Died: Unknown
- Spouse: Princess Jincheng (disputed)
- Dynasty: Yarlung
- Father: Tridu Songtsen

Lha Balpho (Tibetan: ལྷ་བལ་ཕོ་, Wylie: lha bal pho; born c. 697) was a de facto king of the Tibetan Empire briefly from 704 to 705. The circumstances of his reign are not very clear, and he is not counted in most lists of rulers.

== Biography ==
Lha was one of the sons of Tridu Songtsen, who met a hasty end in 704. The Old Book of Tang states that the southern tributaries of the empire revolted and during the imperial military reaction, Tridu Songtsen was killed. Due to squabbling by his sons, his seven-year-old son Lha was enthroned.

Tibetan Annals from Dunhuang briefly mention that an older brother of Tridé Tsuktsen was deposed in 705. There is no information about the circumstances of his brief enthronement, or the causes of his disgrace. Possibly it had something to do with the disturbances in the southern dependencies of the empire that took place at this time. On the basis of these materials, American historian Christopher Beckwith argues that Tridé Tsuktsen did not succeed his father immediately. Rather, the throne was briefly held by Lha, also possibly called Lha Balpho. After a short while, his powerful grandmother, the queen dowager Khri ma lod, dethroned him and placed the infant Gyal Tsugru – the future Tridé Tsuktsen – on the throne. The coup was accompanied by revolts and executions involving the vassal state Serib at the south-western border of Tibet.

Lha was apparently not killed. It has been suggested that he was the person who actually received Princess Jincheng as his bride in 710, though this is very unclear. The princess is usually regarded as the consort of TridéTsuktsen.

Regnal titles
Preceded by Tridu Songtsen	Emperor of Tibet r. 704-705	Succeeded by Me Agtsom
