= Khri ma lod =

Queen consort of Tibet (d. 712 CE)

Khri ma lod ཁྲི་མ་ལོད
- Tsenmo

Queen regent of Tibet
- Reign: 675 – 689 (first regency)
- Predecessor: Mangsong Mangtsen (as king)
- Successor: Tridu Songtsen (as king)
- Reign: 704 – 712 (second regency)
- Predecessor: Tridu Songtsen (as king)
- Successor: Mé Aktsom (as king)
- Died: 712
- Spouse: Mangsong Mangtsen
- Issue: Tridu Songtsen
Names
- Thrimalo

- Khri ma lod

Tibetan name
- Tibetan: འབྲོ་ཟ་ཁྲི་མ་ལོད
Transcriptions
- Wylie: vbro za khri ma lod
- THL: dro za tri ma lö

Khri ma lod (or Thrimalö) was a queen consort and twice regent of Tibet. She was the queen consort by marriage to King Mangsong Mangtsen. She was the ruler of the Tibetan Empire twice: in 675-689 during the minority of her son, King Tridu Songtsen, and in 704-712 during the minority of her grandson, King Mé Aktsom. Her title as regent was tsenmo (the female equivalent of tsenpo, the Tibetan title most frequently translated king).

== Life ==
Khri ma lod was married to King Mangsong Mangtsen (Trimang Löntsen' or Khri-mang-slon-rtsan). The King died in the winter of 676 to 677, and in the same year she gave birth to the King's son Tridu Songtsen (Khri 'dus-srong btsan or Khri-'dus-srong-rtsan).

The Zhangzhung revolted early in her son's reign. She shared power with the Gar clan. When her son Tridu campaigned in the northeast from 700 to 704, she resumed her administrative regency at home.

Khri ma lod's grandson Mé Aktsom was born in 704 to her daughter-in-law Chimza Tsunmotog (mChims-bza' bTsan-ma Thog-thog-sten), Princess of Chim. Upon the death of Tridu Songtsen that year, his elder son Lha Balpo (Lha Bal-pho) briefly succeeded him before Khri ma lod dethroned him at Pong Lag-rang in favor of the infant, Mé-Aktsom.

Khri ma lod had arranged for a royal marriage of Gyältsugru to a Chinese princess. The Princess Jincheng (金城公主, Tibetan: Kyimshang Kongjo) arrived in 710, but it is somewhat unclear whether she married the seven-year-old Mé-Aktsom or the deposed Lha Balpo.

Khri ma lod died in 712. Mé-Aktsom was then officially enthroned with the royal name Tride Tsuktsen. Khri ma lod remains the only woman in Tibetan history to rule Tibet.
