= Flying cash =

Paper negotiable instrument in China

Flying cash (Chinese: 飛錢), or Feiqian, was a type of paper negotiable instrument used during China's Tang dynasty invented by merchants but adopted by the state. Its name came from their ability to transfer cash across vast distances without physically transporting it. It is a precursor to true banknotes which appeared during the Song dynasty.

According to the New Book of Tang, in the year 804, merchants were using flying cash. A Tang dynasty tax reform that allowed for the partial acceptance of taxes in money increased demand for copper cash coins, leading to a shortage from the years 805 to 820; this was a serious hindrance to everyday business. Concerned that merchants would remove cash coins from the capital to circulate, the dynasty ordered local governments to set up monetary systems based on silk, other fabrics, and daily items, akin to a barter system. This in turn hampered long-distance trade, hurting the national economy.

Originally the government of the Tang dynasty was less than receptive to the idea of bills of exchange and had attempted banning them on multiple occasions, but in 812 flying cash were officially accepted as a valid means of exchange. After the government had accepted these bills, the supervision of flying cash was handled by the Ministry of Revenue, the Tax Bureau, and the Salt Monopoly Bureau. The state began printing their own notes. Flying cash was a particular benefit to tea merchants, who helped improve the trade between the capital and the regions. Flying cash would remain in use until the early period of the Song dynasty.

== Origin ==
Between the years 618 and 758 the Chinese salt monopoly was controlled by local governments, who taxed the producers, under a system known as the Kaizhong policy. In the year 758 the government official Liu Yan convinced the imperial government to actively enforce its salt monopoly again; this became known as the Zhece policy. Under the Zhece policy Chinese, merchants were paid in salt certificates in exchange for supplying the frontier armies directly as opposed to transporting government provisions to them. During the reign of the Emperor Xianzong the supply of cash coins in circulation was scarce and when Chinese merchants would travel to the capital city, the merchants would entrust their money to the representative offices of their local governments, to the various armies of the Tang dynasty, government commissioners, and local rich families. The merchants did this to lighten their traveling burdens as they would hurry away in all directions. When the tallies were matched at a local office, they could withdraw their money.

== Use ==
Flying cash was never originally meant to be used as legal tender and, therefore, their circulation was limited. However, since they could be exchanged for hard currency at the capital with an exchange fee of 100 wén per 1000 wén, they were traded amongst merchants as if they were currency. Flying cash continued to be used in the Five Dynasties era into the beginning of the Song Dynasty in 960.

It was not until the Song dynasty and subsequent Jin occupation that paper money was officially established as a legal tender. Eventually, the Song Dynasty began to issue more notes to pay its bills- a practice that ultimately contributed to runaway inflation.

== See also ==
- Hawala
- Fiat currency
- Economic history of China (Pre-1911)
- Economic history of China (1912–1949)
- Economy of China

== Sources ==
- Kang Guohong (康國宏) (1997). "Feiqian (飛錢)", in Men Kui (門巋), Zhang Yanqin (張燕瑾), ed. Zhonghua guocui da cidian (中華國粹大辭典) (Xianggang: Guoji wenhua chuban gongsi), 104. (in Chinese)
- Yao Enquan (姚恩權) (1993). "Feiqian (飛錢)", in Shi Quanchang 石泉長, ed. Zhonghua baike yaolan (中華百科要覽) (Shenyang: Liaoning renmin chubanshe), 85. (in Chinese)
- Zhou Fazeng (周發增), Chen Longtao (陳隆濤), Qi Jixiang (齊吉祥), ed. (1998). Zhongguo gudai zhengzhi zhidu shi cidian (中國古代政治制度史辭典) (Beijing: Shoudu shifan daxue chubanshe), 362. (in Chinese)
