= Bailang language =

Ancient Tibeto-Burman language of China

Bailang
- Pai-lang
- Native to: China
- Region: western Sichuan
- Era: 1st century AD
- Language family: Sino-Tibetan: (Tibeto-Burman); Lolo-Burmese (?); Bailang

Language codes
- ISO 639-3: None (mis)
- Glottolog: pail1244

Bailang or Pai-lang (Chinese: 白狼; pinyin: Bái láng; lit. 'white wolf') is the earliest recorded Tibeto-Burman language, known from three short songs, totalling 44 four-syllable lines, recorded in a commentary on the Book of the Later Han. The language is clearly either Lolo–Burmese or closely related, but as of the 1970s it presented "formidable problems of interpretation, which have been only partially solved".

== Text ==
The Book of the Later Han (compiled in the 5th century from older sources) relates that the songs were recorded in western Sichuan and a Chinese translation presented to Emperor Ming of Han (58–75 AD). This episode is recorded in the "Treatise on the Southern Barbarians" chapter, which includes the Chinese translation, but not the original songs. The Bailang people are described as living to the west of Wenshan, a mountain of the Minshan range in the southern part of modern Mao County. According to the oldest extant commentary on the Book of the Later Han, by Li Xian (651–684), the Chinese translation was taken from the Dongguan Hanji, which also included a transcription of the Bailang version in Chinese characters. Only a few fragments of the Dongguan Hanji are extant, but Li included this transcription in his commentary, and another variant is found in the 12th-century Tongzhi. Thus in addition to the distortion inherent in transcription, interpretation is complicated by the transmission history of the text and uncertainty about the pronunciation of Eastern Han Chinese.

Several features of the text have led scholars to doubt the traditional view that the songs were translated from Bailang to Chinese: the songs reflect a Chinese world-view, contain many Chinese words and phrases (in addition to apparent loans) and generally follow Chinese word order. In addition, the Chinese versions rhyme while the Bailang versions generally do not. Most modern authors hold that the songs were composed in Chinese and their words translated (where possible) into equivalent Bailang words or phrases, retaining the metrical structure of the Chinese original. This view is disputed by Christopher Beckwith, who claims that the Bailang version shows patterns of assonance and consonance when the characters are read in a southwestern variety of Eastern Han Chinese.

== Classification ==
A vocabulary of some 134 words and phrases has been extracted from the text, including 21 Chinese loanwords. Some 80 of the remaining words have been compared, with varying levels of confidence, to possible Tibeto-Burman cognates. Most authors conclude that Bailang is Lolo-Burmese. However, Coblin argues that some Bailang words appear to be more conservative than reconstructed Proto-Lolo–Burmese, and that it is therefore likely that it was a close relative rather than an actual member of the family. For example, the word for "gorge" is transcribed with the character 龍, whose Old Chinese form is reconstructed by Li Fang-Kuei as *gljung. Coblin argues that the Bailang word retains the consonant cluster of Proto-Sino-Tibetan *klu·ŋ, which has been lost in Proto-Lolo-Burmese *loŋ^{3}. However, in his ABC Etymological Dictionary of Old Chinese (2007, p. 363), Axel Schuessler reconstructs the contemporary Eastern Han Chinese pronunciation as *lioŋ, and reconstructions of the (pre-Han) Old Chinese pronunciation by other scholars differ markedly (see Wiktionary).

== Vocabulary ==
Beckwith (2008: 106–107) lists the following Bailang words with clear Tibeto-Burman etymologies.

- bi, bei 'to give'
- bjar 'to fly'
- ča 'sun'
- či, čei 'what, which'
- gjoʔ (gjok) 'to bend'
- jẽw (jim) 'family, home'
- kun 'same, together'
- liŋŋa 'place, direction'
- lo 'Lo [ethnonym]'
- loʔ (lok) 'to return'
- maʔ (mak) 'son, grandson'
- maʔ (mak) 'mother'
- maʔ (mak) 'negative'
- mew 'heaven'
- ni, nei 'dwell, residence'
- njiɴ 'heart, mind'
- pa 'cloth'
- raɴ 'high, tall'
- roʔ (rawk) 'stone'
- riɴ 'long'
- rja 'hundred'
- rwiɴ 'mountain'
- sa 'flesh'
- siʔ (sik) 'tree, wood'
- tʰwi 'sweet'
- ti, tei 'great, big'
- war 'food'
