= Tridu Songtsen =

3rd Tibetan Emperor and 36th King of Tibet (668–704)

Tridu Songtsen ཁྲི་འདུས་སྲོང་བཙན་
- Tsenpo

King of Tibet
- Reign: c. 676 – 704
- Predecessor: Mangsong Mangtsen
- Successor: Lha Balpo or Tridé Tsuktsen
- Lönchen: Gar Tsenye Dompu; Gar Trinring Tsendro
- Born: Düsong Mangpojé (འདུས་སྲོང་མང་པོ་རྗེ་) c. 668; Drakpu, Tibet (in modern Zhanang County)
- Died: 704 (aged 35 – 36); Mywa territory (modern Yunnan)
- Burial: 706; Lharichen Mausoleum, Valley of the Kings
- Spouse: Chimza Tsenmotok
- Issue: Tridé Tsuktsen
Regnal name
- Tridu Songtsen
- Dynasty: Yarlung
- Father: Mangsong Mangtsen
- Mother: Droza Trimalö
- Religion: Tibetan Buddhism

Tridu Songtsen (Tibetan: ཁྲི་འདུས་སྲོང་བཙན་, Wylie: Khri 'dus-srong btsan) (668 – 704), also known as Dusong Mangban, was the 36th King (Tsenpo) of Tibet from 676 until his death in 704.

== Ascent to throne ==
Dusong ascended the Tibetan throne after the death of his father, Mangsong Mangtsen, in 676. The Old Book of Tang says that Dusong was eight years old in 679—nine years old by Western reckoning. He was, therefore, presumably born in 670 and was six or seven years old when he began his reign. Due to his youth, he was enthroned with the minister Gar Tongtsen's second son, Khri 'bring, to act as regent.

== Political and military activities ==
In 676 the Tibetans made raids on Shanzhou, Guozhou, Hezhou (now Linxia), Diezhou, Migong and Danling in Gansu. The Chinese counterattacked, defeating the Tibetans at Longzhi. The Chinese army led by Li Jingxuan were soundly defeated near Qinghai Lake, however, and by the end of 677 Tibet controlled the whole of the Tarim Basin and the mountainous regions to the southwest.

=== Revolt of Zhangzhung and the leadership of his mother, Khrimalod, and his ministers ===
The western kingdom of Zhangzhung revolted soon after the death of King Mangsong Mangtsen (also known as Trimang Löntsen, Wylie: khri mang slon rtsan) (r. 650–677), the son of Songtsen Gampo, but was brought back under Tibetan control by the "firm governance of the great leaders of the Gar clan" the following year.

Under the leadership of his powerful mother, Khri ma lod, and his ministers and generals during the early part of his reign, Tibet continued to maintain and even expand its territory.

The Tibetans gained control of an important Tang fortress at Anrong in 678 on the Min River north of Chengdu which they held for more than sixty years as a frontier post. According to an 11th-century Chinese history, the Erhe people from the Erhai Lake region in 'Jang, one of the princedoms around the upper waters of the Yangtze which later made up Nanzhao, submitted to Tibet this same year, asking for an alliance against the Chinese. The Old Book of Tang reports:

At that time, Tufan obtained Yangtong, Dangxiang as well as other Chiang people tribal territories. To the east it extended to Liangzhou, Songzhou, and so forth, and to the south it extended to India. On the west they attacked and took over four military governments such as Guici (Kucha), Sule (Kashgar), and so forth, while to the north they extended as far as over 10,000 li to the Tujue (Turks) area. Since the Han and the Wei dynasties, the western barbarians had seen no prosperity comparable to these days' prosperity.

The Chinese army led by Wei Daijia unsuccessfully invaded Tibet in 689. Many of the soldiers died and the commander of the troops was executed for his failure. It was also in this year that the Tibetan princess Khri-bangs was married to an Azha chief to strengthen bonds between the two peoples. They had a son named Ma-ga Thogon Khagan.

Two Tibetan generals defected to the Chinese with their troops in 692. The Chinese then defeated the Tibetans, regaining control of the Tarim Basin and the lucrative trade routes to the West, which they held for almost a century before the Tibetans reconquered the region.

The Turkic Khagan Ton-ya-bgo (Ch. Ashina Tuizi), chief of the Western Dulu in Dzungaria, visited the Tibetan court in 694. together they attacked and defeated the Chinese at Lengjuan.

The following year Dusong successfully attacked Lintao, and Liangzhou.

Gar Trinring Tsendro went to Chang'an in 696 to try to negotiate peace with Empress Wu Zetian (r. 684–705) on condition that China remove all troops from Central Asia and divide the Western Turks between China and Tibet. She refused to negotiate.

Dusong realised that members of the Gar family had become independent warlords and posed a threat to the central authority of the king. So, in 699 he pretended to organise a great hunt and then had his men turn on members of the Gar and their supporters. Then he personally marched north and confronted Gar Trinring Tsendro, who surrendered without a fight and, according to the Old Book of Tang, committed suicide. His brother fled to China.

After this, Dusong asserted the right of the power of the king over his ministers.

Dusong personally led 10,000 troops into four battles in some unnamed place to the northeast in 702. The next year he "established his authority over the 'Jang (Nanzhao), he imposed tribute on the White Mywa, he subdued the Black Mywa (probably the Miao people), and so on."

== Relations with Nepal ==
It seems Nepal remained tributary to Tibet throughout the reign of Dusong. A Nepalese stone edict of 695, during the reign of the Licchavi king, Shivadeva II, records: "because of the reason that Nepal paid taxes to Tibet, five officials must take the responsibility of the coolies who carry the luggage every year." This is confirmed by the Old Book of Tang which record that in 703, soon after Dusong's death, "the subject countries in the south, such as Nepal and others, all revolted." Furthermore, the Tibetan Annals record that Dusong spent the summers of 690, 697 and 699 in Nepal.

== His wives and son ==
Dusong he married two women from important Tibetan clans—'Damgyi Chokroza', and Chimza Tsenmotok (Wylie: mChims-bza' bTsan-ma thog), Princess of Chim, with whom he had a son Tride Tsuktsen (also known later as Me-Agtsom) in 704. It seems Dusong also had a Turkish bride, as the Tibetan Annals record the death of the princess "Gatun" (= Turk: Khatun?) in 708.

== His support of Buddhism ==
Although Dusong is primarily remembered as a warrior, according to the Testament of Ba, he supported Buddhism and had a temple called Khri rtse built in Gling Khams, "and so on", which is recorded on an inscription at sKarchung written by Emperor Sadnalegs about a century later.

== Dusong's death and succession ==
Dusong died in 704 in battle in Mywa territory in modern Yunnan. The Tang Annals state he was on his way to suppress tributary kingdoms on the southern borders of Tibet, including Nepal and parts of India. There was a dispute among his sons but, "after a long time" the people put seven year old Qilisuzan (Wylie: khri lde gtsug btsan), later known as Me Agtsom, on the throne.

Dusong is buried next to his father in the Royal Burial grounds near Yarlung.

== Notes ==
Regnal titles
Preceded by Mangsong Mangtsen	Emperor of Tibet r. 676–704	Succeeded by Me Agtsom
