= Mao Prefecture =

Prefecture in imperial China

- Simplified Chinese: 茂州
- Hanyu Pinyin: Mào Zhōu

Tonghua Commandery; (742–758)
- Simplified Chinese: 通化郡
- Hanyu Pinyin: Tōnghuà Jùn
- History
  - Created: 634 (Tang dynasty)
  - Abolished: 1913 (Republic of China)
  - Succeeded by: Mao County

Maozhou or Mao Prefecture (634–1913) was a zhou (prefecture) in imperial China located in modern northern Sichuan, around modern Mao County. From 742 to 758 it was called Tonghua Commandery.

Situated near the Tibetan frontier, it occasionally fell under Tibetan control.

== Geography ==
The administrative region of Maozhou in the Tang dynasty is in modern northern Sichuan. It probably includes modern:

- Under the administration of Ngawa Tibetan and Qiang Autonomous Prefecture:
  - Mao County
  - Wenchuan County
- Under the administration of Mianyang:
  - Beichuan Qiang Autonomous County
