= Princess Jincheng =

Chinese princess, Tibetan empress

Princess Jincheng 金城公主 ཀྀམ་ཤང་ཁོང་ཅོ་
- Tsenmo

Empress consort of Tibet
- Tenure: 710–739
- Born: 698; Tang China
- Died: 739 (aged 40–41); Tibetan Empire
- Spouse: Me Agtsom or Lha
- House: House of Li; House of Yarlung (by marriage)
- Father: Li Shouli

Princess Jincheng (Tibetan: ཀྀམ་ཤང་ཁོང་ཅོ་, Wylie: KIm-shang Khong-co, also Tibetan: ཀྀམ་ཤེང་ཁོང་ཅོ་, Wylie: KIm-sheng Khong-co; Chinese: 金城公主; pinyin: Jīnchéng Gōngzhǔ; Wade–Giles: Chin-ch'eng Kung-chu, c. 698 – 739), surnamed Li, was an Empress consort of Tibet. She was a member of a minor branch of the royal clan of the Chinese Tang dynasty.

== Life ==
Princess Jincheng was a daughter of Li Shouli, a prince of Tang China. She grew up in the court and was regarded by Emperor Zhongzong of Tang as a foster daughter.

Emperor Zhongzong received an ambassador sent by Empress Dowager Khri ma lod of the Tibetan Empire requesting a marriage alliance between the future emperor, Tridé Tsuktsen, and a Tang princess. Emperor Zhongzong conferred the title of Princess Jincheng upon his foster daughter and, in 710, a minister of Tibet arrived to collect her. On his arrival, Emperor Zhongzong entertained the minister by having his sons-in-law play ball sports with him. Princess Jincheng was then married to the Tibetan emperor Mé Aktsom, in accordance with the heqin policy.

The princess is usually regarded as the consort of Mé-Aktsom. However, Christopher Beckwith has been suggested that Lha, the de facto Tibetan Emperor who ruled briefly in 704 to 705, was the person who actually received the Princess Jincheng as bride in 710, though this is very unclear.

Princess Jincheng was expected to act as an ambassador to the Tibetan Empire and assist as a Tang diplomat to the Tibetan court. In one case, she solved a dispute between the Tibetan and Tang envoys by erecting a plaque to mark the two territories. In 723, unhappy with her marriage, Princess Jincheng asked the King of Kashmir for asylum, but she was persuaded to remain in Tibet. The Emperor Zhongzong, saddened by the loss of his daughter, requested that poems be written in her honor. The poet Wang Zhihuan answered with "Beyond the Border", a reference to her trip through Yumen Pass.
