= Mé Aktsom =

4th Tibetan Emperor and 37th King of Tibet (704-755)

Tridé Tsuktsen མེས་ཨག་ཚོམས
- Tsenpo

King of Tibet
- Reign: 705–755
- Predecessor: Tridu Songtsen or Lha Balpo
- Successor: Trisong Detsen
- Regent: Dro Thrimalö
- Lönchen: list Khu Mangpoje Lhasung; We Trisig Shangnyen; We Trisumje Tsangshar; Nge Mangsham Taktsab; We Tadra Khonglo; Dro Chungsang Ormang; Bel Kyesang Dongtsab
- Born: Gyeltsukru (རྒྱལ་གཙུག་རུ); 704; Lhasa, Tibet
- Died: 755 (aged 50–51); Tibet
- Burial: Lhari Tsuknam Mausoleum, Valley of the Kings
- Consorts: Princess Jincheng; Jangmo Tritsün; Nanamza Mangpodé Zhiteng
- Issue: Jang Tsalhawön; Trisong Detsen
Regnal name
- Tridé Tsuktsen (ཁྲི་ལྡེ་གཙུག་བཙན)
- Dynasty: Yarlung
- Father: Tridu Songtsen
- Mother: Chimza Tsenmotok
- Religion: Tibetan Buddhism

Tridé Tsuktsen (Tibetan: ཁྲི་ལྡེ་གཙུག་བཙན, Wylie: khri lde gtsug btsan), nicknamed Mé Aktsom (Tibetan: མེས་ཨག་ཚོམས, Wylie: mes ag tshoms, "Bearded Grandfather"), was the 37th King (Tsenpo) of Tibet from 704 to 755. He was son of Tridu Songtsen and Tsenma Toktokteng (Tibetan: བཙན་མ་ཐོག་ཐོག་སྟེང, Wylie: btsan ma thog thog steng). His nickname Mé Aktsom ("Bearded Grandfather"), was given to him later in life because he was so hirsute.

His father, Tridu Songtsen, died in 704 in battle in Mywa territory in the Kingdom of Nanzhao (Wylie: 'jang, modern lowland Yunnan). The Old Book of Tang states he was on his way to suppress tributary kingdoms on the southern borders of Tibet, including Nepal and parts of India.

There was a dispute among his sons but "after a long time" the people put seven-year-old Tridé Tsuktsen on the throne.

== Struggle for the throne ==
It is very unclear, however, from the sources exactly what happened after the death of Tridu Songtsen. According to the Tibetan Annals, "he who would be crowned king" (Mé Aktsom) was born in the spring of 704, just a few months before his father died.

Beckwith states that in the winter of 704–705, Lha Balpo, one of the sons of Tridu Songtsen, took the throne, but Thrimalö (Wylie: khri ma lod), the empress dowager, wife of the second emperor, Mangsong Mangtsen, and mother of Tridu Songtsen, "dethroned Lha in favor of the infant Gyaltsugru, the future Tridé Tsuktsen, popularly known as Mé Aktsom. Revolts and executions accompanied the virtual coup, but the Annals and Chinese sources have little to report on them. Lha apparently was not killed, but only forced into semiretirement. It was thus, perhaps, the "Retired Emperor" Lha who actually received and married the Chinese princess Jincheng in 710. In any event, Tibet experienced more internal unrest, and was conspicuously quiet on its borders with China."

Whatever the case, Mé Aktsom was crowned king in 705 CE, although he was not formally enthroned until the death of Thrimalö in 712.

== Princess Jincheng and Buddhism ==
The Chinese Princess Jincheng (?-739), an adoptive daughter of Emperor Zhongzong of Tang (r. 705-710), was sent to Tibet in 710 where, according to most sources, she married Mé-Aktsom, who would have been only six or seven years old at the time. She was known in Tibet as Princess Gyim Shing or The Latter Chinese Princess Ong Cho (Wylie: gyim shing kong jo, rgya bza' rjes ma ong co), or simply "Kim Sheng", and was a devout Buddhist.

Five Buddhist temples were built: 'Ching bu nam ra, Kwa chu in Brag dmar, 'Gran bzang, 'Khar brag and sMas gong.

Buddhist monks from Khotan, fleeing the persecutions of an anti-Buddhist king, were given refuge by Kim Sheng about 737. This story is recorded the Li yul lung btsan pa "Prophecy of the Li Country", a Buddhist history of Khotan which has been preserved as part of the Tengyur.,

Jincheng died during an outbreak of smallpox sometime between 739 and 741. The rise of anti-Buddhist factions in Tibet following the death of the Chinese princess began to blame the epidemic on the support of Buddhism by the king and queen. This forced the monks to flee once again; first to Gandhara, and then to Kosambi in central India where the monks apparently ended up quarreling and killed each other.

== Other wives ==
Mé-Aktsom had two other wives, a noblewoman from the Nanam clan, Nanamza Mangpodé, who died in 730, and a princess from 'Jang (Nanzhao) called Jangmo Tritsün.

== Political and military activities ==
In 717 the Tibetans (according to an 11th-century Chinese history) joined with the Turkic Türgish to attack Kashgar.

In 720 Tibetan troops took the Uighur principality of 'Bug-cor in the Dunhuang oasis.

The Tang Annals report that in 722 the Tibetans attacked Gilgit (Tib. Bru-sha) which could imply that they had already gained control of Ladakh and Baltistan, in order to pass through. However, the Tibetans could have gone through Taglokan region and attacked Gilgit without needing to take Baltistan and Ladakh, as suggested by the paths and trade routes through Shaksgham and through Baltistan.

In 727 the king left to take control of the government of the 'Azha in hand. He then seized the important Chinese fortress of Kva-cu or Guazhou at (Anxi), to the southeast of Dunhuang, which contained supplies for all the Chinese-dominated territories as far as the Western Turks (Dru-gu) to the north and the Tazig (Arabs) to the west, and all this wealth fell into the hands of the Tibetans so that even ordinary Tibetans had fine Chinese silks to dress up in. However, the Chinese managed to drive the Tibetans away in 728, after a siege of eighty-days.

In 724, according to a Chinese encyclopedia of 1013, the Chinese princess, Jincheng secretly wrote to the ruler of Kashmir asking for asylum, but apparently nothing came of this.

In 730 a peace treaty with China was signed which established the border east of Kokonor at the Chiling Pass in the Red Hills. In 733 Mé-Aktsom wrote to the Chinese emperor Xuanzong (r. 712–756) stating that China and Tibet were equally great kingdoms and hoping that peace would endure. In 734 a pillar engraved with the treaty was erected, and although it was apparently torn down soon after, envoys travelled regularly between the Lhasa and Chang'an for the next fifteen years.

In 736 Tibet again attacked Bru-sha (Gilgit), and the ruler came to Tibet to pay homage. Later that year the Chinese also attacked Bru-sha, but in 740 the Tibetan princess Khri-ma-lod married the ruler of Bru-sha.

In 738 the 'Nine Loops of the Huang Ho', which had been given to Tibet as part of a dowry, were retaken by the Chinese.

In 740, the Chinese also regained control of the key fortress at Anrong, just north of Chengdu, which the Tibetans had held for over sixty years. In 742 the Chinese also managed to recapture the formidable fortress of Shipu, near the border in the Red Hills.

In 747 the Chinese, under the command of general Gao Xianzhi (of Goguryeo descent), fought the Tibetans and forced them to leave the region.

In 750, the king of the White Mywa, who formed part of 'Jang (Nanzhao), launched the Tianbao War against Chinese rule and submitted to the king of Tibet.

In 751 The Tibetans again sent troops north of the Jaxartes River (Syr Darya) and helped the Arabs and Qarluq Turks defeat the Chinese at Talas. This decisive battle ended Tang's power in the west.

Also in 751, Kag-la-bon (r. 748–779), the ruler of 'Jang (Nanzhao) in Yunnan, came to pay his respects to Mé-Aktsom. In 753 Mé-Aktsom sent him a golden diplomatic seal and in 754 and 756, Tibetan armies were sent to help the Nanzhao fight off the Chinese.

== Relations with Nepal ==
Just prior to Mé-Aktsom's accession, in 703, the Tang Annals record that, "the subject countries in the south, such as Nepal and others, all revolted." The rebellion was put down quickly as the Tibetan Annals state that in 705, "the scion prince was crowned king and the grandmother Khri-ma-lod died at Drong"; that some rebels were put to death, and that "at Pong lag-rang, the elder prince was deposed from the throne" Mé-Aktsom spent the summers of 707–712, 718, 719, 722 and 723 in Bal.

== Support for Buddhism ==
The inscription on the Skar-cung pillar, erected during the reign of Sadnalegs (reigned c. 800–815) states that, during the reign of Mé-Aktsom, "shrines of the Three Jewels were established by building the temples at Kwa-cu and Mching-phu in Bragmar and so on". The temple at Kwa-chu was presumably built after the Tibetan sack of Guazhou in 727. However, the anti-Buddhist activities following the death of his Chinese wife, and some mention in the edicts of Trisong Detsen and his son Sadnalegs point to dissension and suppression of Buddhism - at least in the latter part of his reign.

== Death and succession ==
Mé-Aktsom was apparently murdered in a palace revolt sponsored by two ministers in 755, as the pillar erected later at Zhol in front of the Potala states. He was followed by his famous pro-Buddhist son, Trisong Detsen, who was given the epithet "Dharma King".

== Footnotes ==
Regnal titles
Preceded by Tridu Songtsen	Emperor of Tibet r. 705–755	Succeeded by Trisong Detsen
