= Kazakhstan–Saudi Arabia relations =

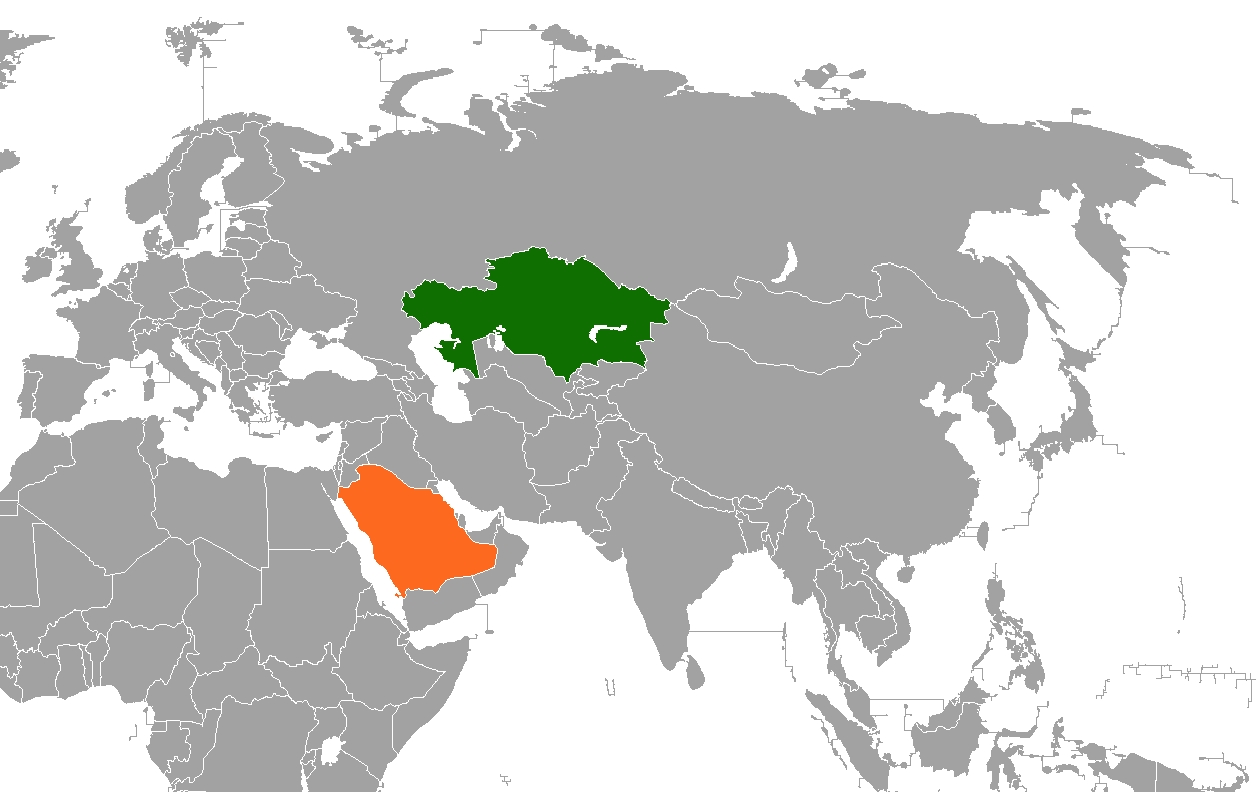

- Kazakhstan: Saudi Arabia

Kazakhstan–Saudi Arabia relations are foreign relations between Kazakhstan and Saudi Arabia. Kazakhstan has an embassy in Riyadh, while Saudi Arabia has an embassy in Astana.

== History ==
Islam, which originated from the Arabian Peninsula, arrived to what would be Kazakhstan at the 7th and 8th century, though not until the Battle of Talas in 751, where Tang dynasty was defeated by the Abbasid Caliphate, was Islam able to flourish. Still, not until the collapse of Anxi Protectorate that eliminated Chinese influence and control, did Islam officially dominate the entire region. However, with the collapse of Arab influence in the region, the people of what would be modern Kazakhstan went on to have their own separate entities, with Kara-Khanid Khanate the first state to adopt Islam, yet it also marked the severance of Arab–Kazakh relations, which would not resurrect until the collapse of the Soviet Union.

== Modern relations ==
Kazakhstan is the largest Central Asian nation and thus holds enormous importance to Saudi Arabia. The two nations established relations on 30 April 1994. In 2023 alone, trade relations between them reached a surplus of 71%. Since then, Saudi Arabia has invested $110 billion into Kazakhstan by 2024, and relations between two countries are described as strategic partnership. Kazakhstan also seeks to diversify partners to reduce dependence on Russia and China, which Saudi Arabia is considered to help fill the void.

Saudi Arabia and Kazakhstan are also major energy partners, both being oil-rich states. Both are members of OPEC, and both have supported each other in dealing with the energy issues.

In February 2025, Kazakhstan's ambassador to Saudi Arabia, Madiyar Menilbekov, in an interview with Saudi media, expressed desire to expand ties.

=== Religious relations ===
Following the collapse of USSR, Saudi Arabia has sought to actively promote the Salafi movement in Hanafi-dominated Kazakhstan. Saudi influence has been growing since 2000s, with more and more Saudi-funded Islamic schools preaching Salafi thoughts emerge in Kazakhstan. However, this is not well-perceived in Kazakhstan due to many attacks caused by Salafists across the country, which sought to portray itself as a Muslim nation with diverse culture; most Kazakh Salafis have largely opted to stay low to avoid problems. Amidst the rise of Islamic radicalism, efforts to balance Islam and secularism are required.
