= Duan Xiushi =

Duan Xiushi (Chinese: 段秀實; 719 – November 6, 783), courtesy name Chenggong (成公), posthumous name Prince Zhonglie of Zhangye (張掖忠烈王), was a general of the Chinese Tang dynasty. He was known for his strict military discipline. In 783, after Emperor Dezong fled the capital Chang'an in the midst of a revolt at Chang'an led by the general Zhu Ci, Duan made a desperate attempt to assassinate Zhu and was killed in the attempt.

== During Emperor Xuanzong's reign ==
Duan Xiushi was born in 719, during the reign of Emperor Xuanzong. His family was from Long Prefecture (隴州, roughly modern Qingyang, Gansu), as the family settled there after his great-grandfather Duan Shijun (段師濬) served as the prefect of Long Prefecture. Both his grandfather Duan Da (段達) and father Duan Xingchen (段行琛) served as military officers. It was said that Duan Xiushi was filially pious in his childhood, and when he was five, when his mother fell ill, he was so distressed that he could not eat or drink for seven days; only after his mother got better did he resume eating and drinking. After he grew, he was said to be silent and decisive. His friends wanted to recommend him for the imperial examinations—specifically, for the Mingjing (明經) examinations, which required study of one of the Five Classics. Duan responded, "Looking through the book and memorizing sentences is not a great achievement," and he refused to sit for the examination.

Duan later came to serve under the military governor (Jiedushi) of Anxi Circuit (安西, headquartered in modern Aksu Prefecture, Xinjiang), Fumeng Lingcha (夫蒙靈詧), and after he distinguished himself in a Fumeng-commanded campaign against Humi (護蜜, centered on modern Faizabad, Uttar Pradesh) in 745, he was made a key officer in the Anxi army. After Gao Xianzhi replaced Fumeng in 748, Duan continued to serve under Gao. He participated in Gao's campaign to the west in 751 that culminated in the Battle of Talas against Abbasid forces, which saw Gao's forces defeated by Abbasid forces. In the aftermath of the defeat, Gao's deputy Li Siye suggested full retreat by Gao—abandoning some of the soldiers who had become lost after the battle. Duan rebuked Li Siye, stating, "Fleeing in light of your fear of the enemy is no bravery, and sparing yourself to allow others to be trapped is no kindness." Li Siye was embarrassed, and he and Duan subsequently made an attempt to gather the scattered troops to organize them into an orderly retreat. After the army returned to Anxi, Li Siye recommended Duan to Gao to serve as the circuit's secretary. In 753, when Gao's successor Feng Changqing attacked Greater Bolü (大勃律, centering modern Gilgit, Pakistan), after the initial successes, Feng was set to pursue the Greater Bolü king, when Duan pointed out that the king's flight might be a trap—and at Duan's suggestion, Feng made a thorough search in the area of the battle, finding many Greater Bolü soldiers who had hidden themselves, ready for a surprise attack. This allowed Feng to finish the victory over Greater Bolü. Duan was thereafter promoted in rank.

== During Emperor Suzong's reign ==
In 755, the general An Lushan rebelled at Fanyang (范陽, in modern Beijing) and established a new state of Yan. In 756, his forces approached the Tang capital Chang'an, forcing Emperor Xuanzong to flee to Chengdu. Emperor Xuanzong's son and crown prince Li Heng did not follow him to Chengdu, but instead fled to Lingwu, where he was declared emperor (as Emperor Suzong), an act that Emperor Xuanzong later recognized. Emperor Suzong ordered that the key military circuits send armies to aid him. When his order reached Anxi, the military governor Liang Zai (梁宰), after consulting with Li Siye, initially decided not to act on the order and to wait for further development. Duan Xiushi rebuked Li Siye:

How can it be that the emperor requests emergency aid and a subject calmly refuses? You, Tejin [(特進, the honorific title that Li Siye carried at the time)], have considered yourself a man, and today, you are merely acting like a child.

Li Siye was embarrassed, and he subsequently met with Liang and persuaded Liang to commission an army, with Li Siye himself in command and Duan as deputy, to join Emperor Suzong at Lingwu. Soon thereafter, Duan's father died, and he spent time in morning. As Li Siye felt that Duan's service was indispensable, he requested that Duan be recalled into active service.

In 757, a joint Tang-Huige army recaptured Chang'an and then the eastern capital Luoyang, forcing An Lushan's son and successor An Qingxu to flee to Yecheng. Tang forces put Yecheng under siege, and Li Siye, one of the Tang commanders at the siege, made Duan the prefect of Huai Prefecture (懷州, in modern Jiaozuo, Henan) to be responsible for logistics—the shipping of food supplies from the area to the army at Yecheng. In spring 759, Li Siye died in battle during the siege. The Anxi army supported Li Siye's subordinate Lifei Yuanli (荔非元禮) to take over the command, and Emperor Suzong agreed. Duan remained as Lifei's deputy. Subsequently, at Duan's request, Li Siye's casket was sent to Hezhong (河中, in modern Yuncheng, Shanxi), where it was buried in grand ceremony at Duan's expense. This touched Lifei greatly, and he recommended Duan for a promotion in rank. In 762, while a number of armies were at Hezhong, including the Anxi army, Lifei was killed in an army mutiny, along with many other officers, but the soldiers respected Duan and did not dare to harm him. Subsequently, Bai Xiaode (白孝德) was put in command of the Anxi army, and Duan remained as Bai's deputy. This continued after Bai was made the military governor of Fufang Circuit (鄜坊, headquartered in modern Yan'an, Shaanxi).

== During Emperor Daizong's reign ==
Also in 762, Emperor Suzong died and was succeeded by his son Emperor Daizong. In 763, when Tufan forces launched a surprise attack against Chang'an and forced Emperor Daizong to flee to Shan Prefecture (陝州, in modern Sanmenxia, Henan), Duan Xiushi persuaded Bai Xiaode to join the forces of the other circuits in aiding the emperor. Subsequently, Bai was made the military governor of Binning Circuit (邠寧, headquartered in modern Xianyang, Shaanxi), and Duan continued to serve as his deputy. At one time, when the circuit lacked food, Bai temporarily moved his army to Fengtian (奉天, also in modern Xianyang). However, Fengtian was then in a state of confusion as the local government had collapsed, and the soldiers, in response, were pillaging the area. Duan requested to serve as discipline officer as well, and subsequently, Duan imposed strict discipline on the army and stopped the pillaging. Upon the army's return to Binning's capital Bin Prefecture, Duan was created the Prince of Zhangye.

Later in the year, there was a Tufan incursion, and an army commanded by Guo Ziyi, the deputy supreme commander of the armed forces (in effect, the supreme commander, as Emperor Daizong's son Li Kuo the Crown Prince was the nominal supreme commander) helped to defend Bin Prefecture against Tufan forces. After the Tufan threat subsided, Guo returned to Chang'an, but his forces, under the command of his son Guo Xi (郭晞), remained at Bin Prefecture. Guo Xi's soldiers lacked proper discipline and became a major problem for the people of Bin Prefecture, and Bai was troubled but unsure what to do because Guo Xi was Guo Ziyi's son. Duan volunteered to again be discipline officer, and after one month, there was an incident when 17 of Guo Xi's soldiers, in a dispute with a wine seller, killed him and destroyed the winemaking equipment. Duan arrested them and beheaded them. Guo Xi's soldiers were incensed, armed themselves, and got ready to attack Bai's headquarters. Duan went to Guo Xi's headquarters with only one old man attending him. When he arrived there, the soldiers were surprised that he arrived effectively alone. Duan stated, "Why wear your armor for this old soldier? I brought my head with me." He then spoke to them:

What has the Minister [(an honorary title that Guo Xi carried)] done to you, and what has the Deputy Supreme Commander done to you? Why are you destroying the Guo household?

When Guo Xi came out of his tent to meet Duan, Duan rebuked him:

The Deputy Supreme Commander's achievements fills all space between heaven and earth, and you need to make sure that it has a good end. Now, you, Minister, are letting your soldiers commit violent deeds and even consider mutiny. If a mutiny occurs, not only would it adversely effect the Deputy Supreme Commander, but you would be the leader of the mutiny. How much can the reputation of the Guo household remain?

Guo Xi was embarrassed and rebuked his soldiers, ordering them to stand down. That night, Duan stayed at Guo Xi's tent, and Guo Xi was up all night to protect him. The next day, Guo Xi, accompanied by Duan, visited Bai to apologize. Thereafter, the pillaging of Bin Prefecture ended.

In 766, Ma Lin (馬璘) replaced Bai as the military governor of Binning. Duan continued to serve as his deputy. It was said that whenever Ma made wrong decisions, Duan would argue with him about it and would not leave until Ma changed his mind. On one occasion, Ma became angry and threatened to kill Duan when Duan insisted, but Duan did not fear the threats, stating, "Why get angry about executing me if I deserve execution? If, on the other hand, I do not deserve execution, then you are unjust." Ma stormed out, but subsequently invited Duan to a feast to apologize. It was said that because of Duan's counsel, Ma received excellent reputation while governing Binning.

Around the new year 769, at the suggestion of the chancellor Yuan Zai, the three prefectures belonging to Binning Circuit were merged into Guo Ziyi's command. Ma, along with his army, was moved to Jingyuan Circuit (涇原, headquartered in modern Pingliang, Gansu). Ma took part of the army to the capital of Jingyuan Circuit, Jing Prefecture, first, to rebuild the walls, while briefly having Duan remain at Bin Prefecture to oversee the troop movements. The soldiers under Ma's command were still largely soldiers who had come from Anxi in 756 to fight the Yan rebels and who had since been moved multiple locations. They were displeased about being moved once again, and the officer Wang Tongzhi (王童之) subsequently organized a plot to rise in mutiny. Duan found out about the plot and prepared to counteract; once Wang's plot exposed itself, he executed Wang and eight other coconspirators, and the rest of the army did not dare to resist the subsequent move to Jing Prefecture.

In 773, during a Tufan incursion, Ma suffered a battle loss at the hands of Tufan forces and was trapped outside the city, unable to enter. His subordinate Jiao Lingchen (焦令諶) fled back into the city and suggested that Duan close the city gates to get ready for the Tufan assault. Duan responded, "The Governor has not returned. We need to use all of our strength to fight the barbarians. How can we just seek to spare ourselves?" He then told Jiao, "According to military laws, the penalty for losing your commander is death. Have you forgotten that?" Jiao became fearful, and Duan sent him back out to fight Tufan forces, forcing them to withdraw and allowing Ma to return to the city.

In 776, Ma grew deathly ill, and he made Duan acting military governor before dying. With the soldiers gathering to mourn Ma, Duan was apprehensive that some soldiers would use this opportunity to mutiny. He therefore took careful precautions while arranging Ma's mourning, ordering that Ma's family, officers, soldiers, and commoners be segregated in their mourning and arresting anyone who disobeyed the orders. When he received reports that the officers Shi Tinggan (史廷幹), Cui Zhen (崔珍), and Zhang Jinghua (張景華) were plotting mutiny and planning to rise at Ma's funeral, he defused the situation by sending Shi to Chang'an to serve in the imperial guards and sending Cui and Zhang out of the headquarters to other posts. He was thus able to preserve the peace at the circuit without killing anyone. In 777, Emperor Daizong made Duan the military governor. It was said that while Duan was strict, he was also gracious and governed simply. He did not gather wealth, and he did not have concubines. Except for official gatherings, he did not feast. In 778, when there was another Tufan incursion, Emperor Daizong sent Duan, along with Guo Ziyi and Zhu Ci, to defend against the incursion.

== During Emperor Dezong's reign ==
Emperor Daizong died in 779 and was succeeded by Li Kuo (as Emperor Dezong). By 780, the chancellor Yang Yan had become very powerful and, having been a close associate of Yuan Zai's, was intent on reviving Yuan's proposals with regard to Tufan, which were abandoned after Yuan's fall from grace in 777. These proposals included rebuilding Yuan Prefecture (原州, in modern Guyuan, Ningxia), at that time in no-man's land between Tang and Tufan, to use as a forward advance position; and restoring Lingyang Canal (陵陽渠, flowing through Bayan Nur, Inner Mongolia), to allow the soldiers stationed in the area to farm. When Emperor Dezong sent a eunuch to Jingyuan to request Duan Xiushi's opinion, Duan opposed on the basis that Tang did not then have adequate number of troops on the border and these acts would provoke a Tufan attack. Yang was displeased, and he had Duan removed from his military governor position and recalled to Chang'an to serve in the relatively unimportant post of minister of agriculture (司農卿, Si'nong Qing). As the way back to Chang'an goes through Fengxiang (鳳翔, in modern Baoji, Shaanxi), which was then under Zhu Ci's command, he cautioned his family members that, when they were also to return to Chang'an, Zhu would surely try to give him a substantial gift and that they should not accept it on his behalf. Once they were at Fengxiang, Zhu did give a substantial amount of silk as a gift; Duan's family members tried to decline, but accepted it after Zhu insisted. Once they arrived at Chang'an, Duan was angered that they received the gift and refused to take the gift inside his mansion; instead, he took the silk to the ministry of agriculture and stored it above the roof support. (After Duan's departure from Jingyuan, his subordinate Liu Wenxi (劉文喜) used his removal as an excuse to occupy Jingyuan and rebel; the other officers then turned against him and killed him.) While serving as minister of agriculture, Duan observed that the imperial guard soldiers were few and weak, and he suggested recruiting more soldiers for the imperial guards; Emperor Dezong ignored his suggestion.

In late 783, Jingyuan soldiers, who had been summoned to Chang'an in anticipation of being sent east to battle warlords Zhu Tao (Zhu Ci's brother), Li Na, Wang Wujun, and Tian Yue, who had declared themselves princes, were at Chang'an, when they were angered by the lack of rewards given by Emperor Dezong. On November 2, 783, they rose in mutiny and, with the imperial guard soldiers inadequate to resist them, Emperor Dezong fled to Fengtian. The Jingyuan soldiers supported Zhu Tao—who had been removed from his command on account of Zhu Tao's rebellion—as their leader. Zhu Tao initially pretended to be interested in calming the situation at Chang'an and then welcome Emperor Dezong back to Chang'an, but was secretly planning on taking over as emperor. He gathered a group of disaffected officials, including the chancellor Li Zhongchen, Zhang Guangsheng (張光晟), Yao Xiu (姚休), and Yao Lingyan (姚令言), and involved them in his plans. Believing that Duan was similarly disaffected, he sent soldiers to summon Duan as well. Duan initially refused, but was forced by the soldiers to meet Zhu. Once he did, Zhu tried to dissuade him from his plot and to welcome the emperor back to Chang'an. Zhu did not listen to him, but as he admired Duan, tried to continue to deal with Duan cordially. Duan, however, secretly plotted with his subordinates Liu Haibin (劉海賓), He Mingli (何明禮), and Qi Lingyue (岐靈岳), to assassinate Zhu and welcome Emperor Dezong back.

Meanwhile, Zhu had sent Yao's subordinate Han Min (韓旻) with 3,000 men toward Fengtian—claiming to be welcoming Emperor Dezong home but instead planning on attacking Emperor Dezong. Duan found out about this, he had Qi forge an order from Yao to return to Chang'an. Once Han received the forged orders, he changed directions and returned to Chang'an. Duan, believing that once Han returned to Chang'an his plot would be exposed, then planned for an immediate assassination of Zhu. On November 6, Zhu convened a meeting with Li, Yuan, Yao, and Duan, to discuss the matters of declaring himself emperor. During the meeting, Duan leaped up, grabbed Yuan's writing board, and began to batter Zhu with it. Zhu's guards were caught by surprise and did not know what to do. Liu, who was then supposed to enter with soldiers, froze with fear and fled instead. With Li's help, Zhu escaped further attack by Duan, who was then killed by Zhu's guards—despite Zhu's yelling, "He is a righteous man. Do not kill him!" After Duan's death, Zhu mourned greatly and buried him with honors. When Emperor Dezong heard the news, he also mourned Duan greatly. After Zhu Ci's rebellion was put down in 784, he gave high offices to Duan's sons and erected a monument for Duan, personally writing the title for the monument.

== Notes and references ==
- Old Book of Tang, vol. 128.
- New Book of Tang, vol. 153.
- Zizhi Tongjian, vols. 216, 218, 221, 223, 224, 225, 226, 228.
