= Ko Sagye =

Goguryeo general (fl. 7th century)

- Hangul: 고사계
- Hanja: 高舍鷄
- RR: Go Sagye
- MR: Ko Sagye

Ko Sagye (Korean: 고사계; Hanja: 高舍鷄; Hanyu Pinyin: Gāo Shèjī; fl. 7th century) was a general of Goguryeo in 668 CE. He was taken captive by the Tang dynasty after Goguryeo's fall, and subsequently served as a general for the Tang before his son Gao Xianzhi succeeded him.

== Background ==
General Ko Sagye was a distant relative of the Goguryeo's ruling House of Ko. Ko became a general of Goguryeo from an unknown age and served under Bojang of Goguryeo.

== Fall of Goguryeo and captured by Tang ==
The Tang and Silla, a Korean kingdom, launched a major invasion of Goguryeo in 668. The Tang-Silla Alliance destroyed all major frontier fortresses of Goguryeo. The Tang then bypassed Ansi fortress and headed straight for Pyongyang. At the same time, General Ko was captured by Tang soldiers and taken captive.

After submission to Tang, he served briefly as a general in the Protectorate General to Pacify the West, where his son Gao Xianzhi was born and eventually succeeded him.

== See also ==
- Goguryeo
- Ko Sŏnji
- Dae Jung-sang
