= Siye =

Siye may refer to the following people:

- Siye Abraha (born 1955), Ethiopian politician
- Li Siye (died 759), general of the Tang dynasty
