= Battle of Talas =

751 battle between the Abbasid Caliphate and the Tang dynasty

Coordinates: 42°31′30″N 72°14′0″E

- Part of the Muslim conquest of Transoxiana
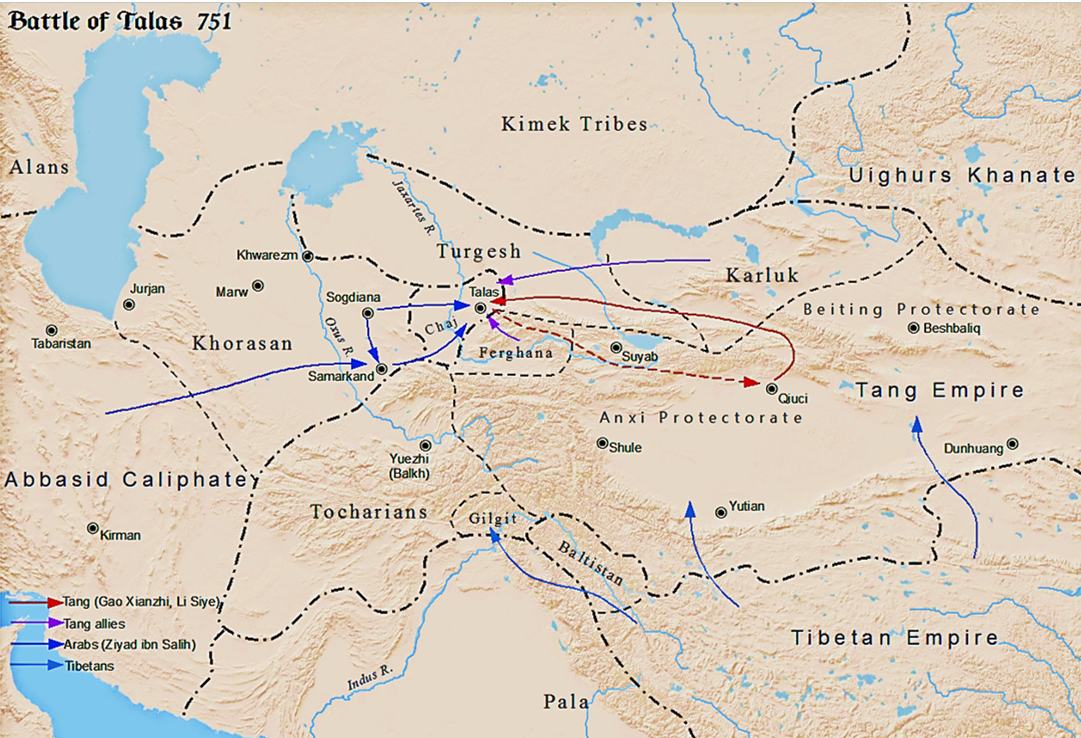
- Scheme of the battle
Date	May–September 751
Location	Talas River, Tang dynasty
Result	Abbasid victory
Territorial changes	Consolidation of Abbasid rule in Transoxania; End of Tang presence in Transoxania

Belligerents
Abbasid Caliphate; Tibetan Empire	Tang dynasty; Ferghana Kingdom; Karkota dynasty

Commanders and leaders
Al-Saffah; Abu Muslim; Ziyad ibn Salih	Gao Xianzhi; Li Siye; Duan Xiushi

Strength
Chinese sources: 200,000; 20,000–30,000 Karluks; Modern estimate: 30,000	Chinese sources: 10,000–20,000 Tang soldiers 20,000–30,000 Karluks (later defected to Abbasid side); Arab sources: 100,000; Modern estimate: 30,000

Casualties and losses
Unknown	Chinese sources: 20,000–30,000 killed ~2,000 survived and retreated Arab sources: 45,000–50,000 killed 20,000–25,000 captured

The Battle of Talas (Chinese: 怛羅斯戰役; pinyin: Dáluósī Zhànyì; Arabic: معركة نهر طلاس, romanized: Maʿrakat nahr Ṭalās) was an armed confrontation between the Abbasid Caliphate along with the Tibetan Empire against the Tang dynasty and its allies in 751. In July of that year, the Tang and Abbasid armies clashed at the Talas River over control of the regions surrounding the Syr Darya. The Tang army under Gao Xianzhi was defeated by the Abbasid army under Ziyad ibn Salih and Karluk mercenaries. Sources differ on whether the Karluks defected to the Abbasids or if they were Abbasid allies from the start. The defeat marked the end of Tang influence in Transoxiana and halted Tang westward expansion.

After the battle, the caliph dispatched an envoy to the emperor, who arrived in December 752 to negotiate the restoration of diplomatic relations. Chinese prisoners captured at Talas in 751 are said to have introduced papermaking to the peoples of West Asia, although this account is disputed by several findings.

== Location ==
Map of Transoxiana, with the Talas River in the upper right

The exact location of the battle has not been confirmed but is believed to be near Taraz and Talas, on the border between present-day Kazakhstan and Kyrgyzstan. The Chinese name 怛羅斯; Dáluósī was first seen in the account of Xuanzang. Du Huan located the city near the western drain of the Chui River.

== Background ==
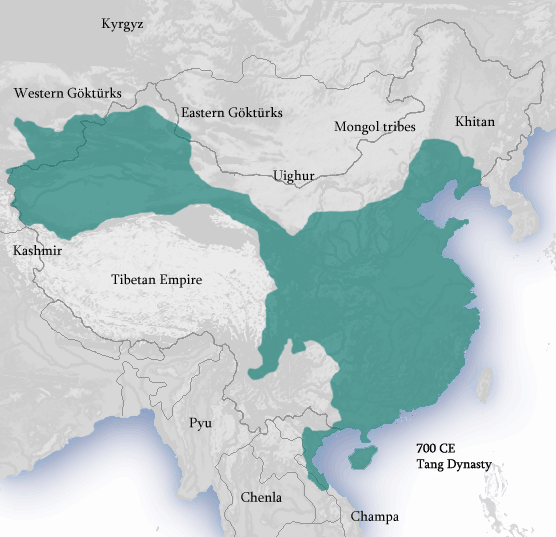
The territorial extent of the Tang dynasty c. 700, showing the long and narrow Hexi Corridor connecting its expanded western frontier to China proper

The oasis towns on the Silk Road in central Asia had once been controlled by the Türgesh, but the Turkic tribal confederation plunged into chaos in the latter half of the 7th century. Empress Wu had retaken control of the Tarim Basin from the Tibetan Empire in 692 as part of the Tang expansion in Inner Asia and the oasis towns became a major source of income for the Tang. In 705, Qutayba ibn Muslim started to lead the Umayyad army on campaigns to conquer towns along the Silk Road, exploiting Türgesh infighting. The caliphate conquered the oasis towns Bukhara and Samarkand, expanding the border of their empire eastwards. At the same time, the Türgesh khagan Suluk began uniting the infighting Türgesh tribes.

The first military engagement between the Arabs and Chinese occurred in 715. During his second invasion of Fergana, Qutayba allied with the Tibetan Empire and a faction within the Ferghana Kingdom, together they defeated the reigning Ikhshid of Fergana and pursued him to Kashgar (which the Arabs raided), but he managed to flee to the Tang controlled Kuqa and requested the aid of Emperor Xuanzong of Tang. In December 715, 10,000 Tang soldiers defeated the Tibetan-Arab army -weakened by the failed rebellion and death of Qutayba- at the Battle of Namangan and reinstated Ikhshid as Fergana's king. The second confrontation between the Arabs and the Chinese was in 717, when the Umayyads and Tibetans made a coordinated attempt to seize the Tarim Basin and its Four Garrisons of Anxi from the Tang. Taking Kashgar once more, they advanced 400km northwest and lay siege to Aksu City and Uqturpan. However, they were defeated by the Tang military and Karluks of Ashina Xian on August 15th 717, at the Battle of Aksu. Resulting in many cities and principalities of Transoxiana and Tokharistan appealed to Tang for assistance against the Arabs.

Location of Aksu and Uqturpan

In 715, the Tang emperor declined the demand of the Türgesh tribe leader Suluk to be recognized as Khagan, instead offering him the rank of duke within the Tang military. In response, Suluk invaded the Tarim Basin along with the Tibetans, but they were driven out by the cavalry of Ashina Xian.

Suluk and his soldiers regularly challenged Umayyad–Tang control of the oasis towns, to such an extent that the Tang made an alliance with the Umayyads against Suluk in 735. Planning a joint attack on Suyab, the Turgesh capital. However, the Tang defeated Suluk at Beshbalik in early 736, and the planned Sino-Arab campaign never came to fruition. (Note: The original source for the 735 Sino-Arab Alliance "The Collected Works of Minister Zhang of Qujiang, Chancellor of the Tang Dynasty" (唐丞相曲江张先生文集) Volume 8:密令安西徴蕃汉兵一万人仍使人星夜倍道与大食计会取叶护㪍逹等路入碎叶令王斛斯自领精𮪍取其家口 "You shall secretly order the Military Governor of the Anxi protectorate to draft 10,000 foreign and Chinese troops; then dispatch messengers to travel day and night at double speed to coordinate with the Arabs to plan with them to take the Yabghu road and Bedel pass roads to enter Suyab. Order Wang Huxi to personally lead elite cavalry to capture the enemy's families and dependents." As well as Volume 10, praising the Arabs: 勑王斛斯得卿表并大食东靣将军呼逻散诃宻表具知卿使张舒耀计会兵马廻此虽逺蕃亦是强国观其意理似存信义若四月出兵是实卿彼巳合知之还湏量宜与其相应使知此者计会不是空言且突𮪍施负恩为天所弃诃宻若䏻助国破此冦讐録其逺劳即合优赏但未知事实不可虚行卿可观察蕃情颇有定否即湏随事慰接令彼知之若舒耀等虚有报章未得要领岂徒不实当有所惩絶域行人不容易也今秋此贼形候如何善湏防之勿使侵轶时暑卿及将士巳下并平安好遣书指不多及 We have received your memorial, alongside the secret report from Hu-luo-san Khami (Khorasan), the General of the Eastern Front of Dashi (the Arabs). We fully understand that the troops and horses you dispatched via Zhang Shuyao have returned from their coordination mission. Although Dashi is a distant foreign land, it is a powerful nation. Judging by the tone and reasoning of their message, they seem to possess sincerity and righteousness. If it is true that they will deploy their troops in the fourth month, your forces over there should already be aware of it. You must respond to them accordingly based on the circumstances, letting them know that our coordination is not empty talk. Furthermore, the Turgesh have turned their backs on Our kindness and have been abandoned by Heaven. If Khami (Khorasan) can assist our empire in destroying these enemy rebels, We shall record their long-distance toil and grant them exceptional rewards. However, since the exact facts are not yet fully verified, we cannot act blindly. You must observe the sentiments of the barbarians to see if there is any definitive certainty, and receive them accordingly as events unfold, ensuring they are kept informed.) In spite of this the Tang-Umayyad alliance lasted a few more years, with the Tang even preferring to maintain the alliance instead of coming to the aid of its own vassal, the Kingdom of Tashkent, which the Arabs were invading.

At the same time, Türgesh tribes established metal industries in Tang-controlled Fergana Valley, an area that was also home to important centres of iron production. The Karluks, a federation of three Türgesh tribes with settlements around Tian Shan, were producers and exporters of iron weapons to the Tibetan Empire and the Tang dynasty.

In 747, the Tang general Gao Xianzhi, who had successfully fought the Tibetan empire in the Pamir Mountains, established control over the Gilgit region. In early 748, the Abbasid general Abu Muslim occupied Merv, the capital of Greater Khorasan, and went on to lead what has become known as the Abbasid Revolution. In 750, Abu al-'Abbas al-Saffah was proclaimed the first Abbasid caliph in the great mosque of Kufa. The Umayyad Caliphate fell in 750 at the Battle of the Zab. Abu Muslim had raised an army that included Muslims and non-Muslims, which he dispatched westwards to take control over Umayyad territory. In Fergana, the Tang general Gao Xianzhi raised an army by recruiting Karluk Turks. During the reign of Lalitaditya Muktapida, the Karkota dynasty of Kashmir that acknowledged the Tang as suzerain or their vassal lord, supported the Chinese against the Tibetans.

== Battle ==
=== Prelude ===
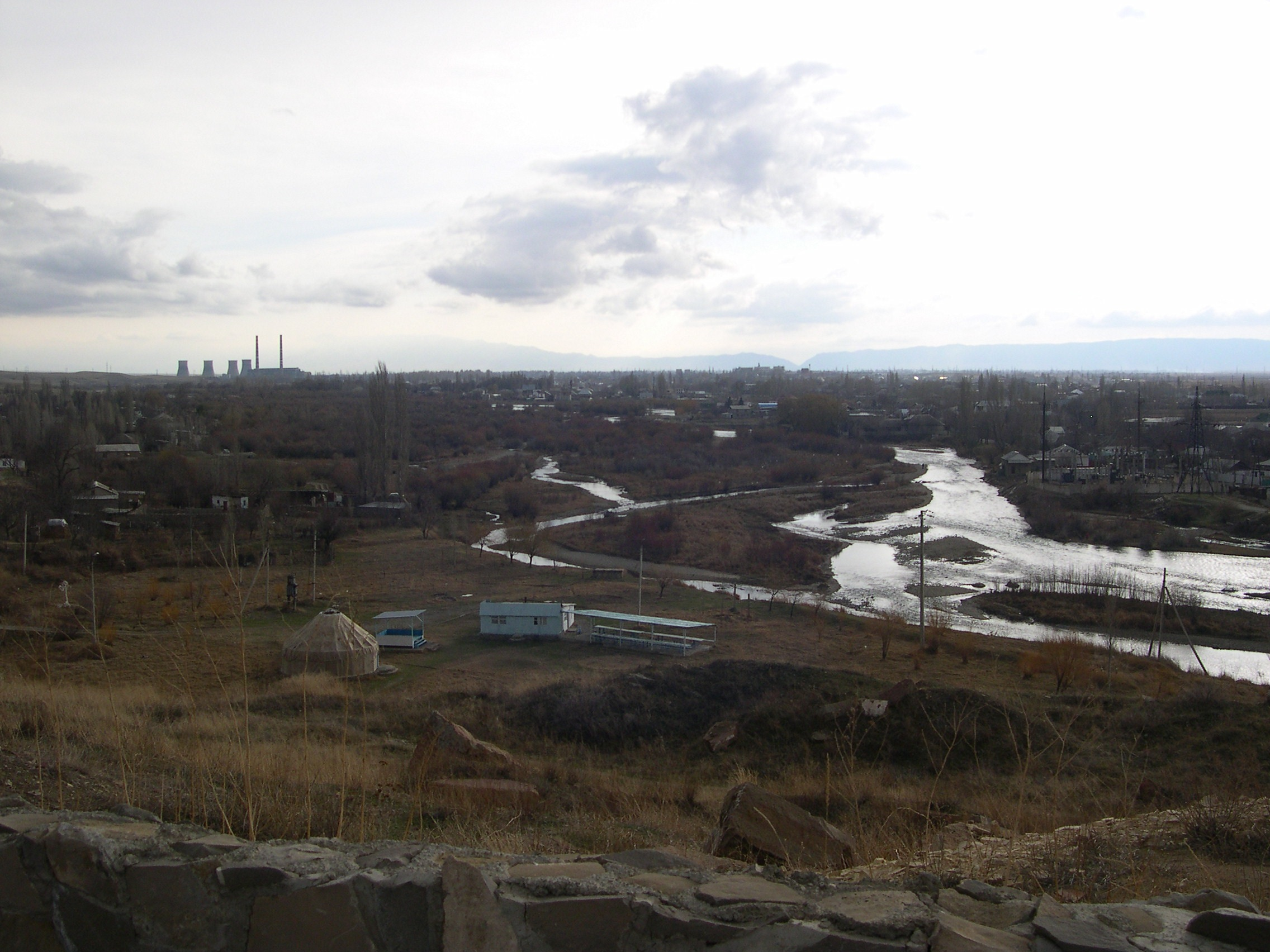
Modern view of Talas River, which starts in the mountains of Kyrgyzstan and winds down into Kazakhstan. On the right side of the river is the city of Taraz.

The confrontation first emerged during the incident in the land of Shash (modern Tashkent). The Ikhshid of Ferghana came into conflict with the king of Shash and sought assistance from the Chinese ruler. Gao Xianzhi, the commander who led an army of Tang and Karluk soldiers against the kingdom of Shi (Shash) in Tashkent. The king of Shi surrendered and submitted to Chinese authority, after which he and his followers were treated without harm but Gao's army plundered the city anyways. The king was brought back to the Tang capital of Chang'an where he was executed by order of Emperor Xuanzong of Tang. The king's son then sought assistance from the Abbasids in the year 133 AH / 751 CE. Ziyad ibn Salih, commander of the Arab forces of Samarkand, requested reinforcements from Abu Muslim, which arrived in May 751.

=== Numbers ===
The number of the combatants involved in the battle of Talas are not known with certainty. According to Chinese sources, the Abbasid army consisted of 200,000 soldiers, included contingents from their Tibetan ally. On the opposite side, Arabic records put the combined Chinese forces at 100,000. Chinese sources record a combined army of 30,000 consisting of 10,000 Tang infantry and 20,000 Karluk mercenaries. A Western estimate of Abbasid forces puts them at 30,000 strong.

The Tongdian (801), the earliest narrative for battle itself by either side, suggests 30,000 deaths, and the Old Book of Tang (945) counted 20,000 deaths in this battle. Arabic sources estimate Chinese casualties at between 45,000 and 50,000 dead, along with 20,000 to 25,000 captured. Gao Xianzhi's official position was that of the Anxi Jiedu envoy, The total number of Tang troops in the jurisdiction was 24,000 and was stationed in the four countries of Qiuzi, Yanqi, Khotan, and Shule.

=== Battle ===
==== Chinese account ====
Gao Xianzhi was crossing the Pamirs on his return trip to China when he received news of the advancing Arab army and that they were planning to take the Four Garrisons of Anxi. He turned back to confront the Arab army, catching them on the southern bank of the Talas River near the modern city of Taraz. In July 751, the Arab advance guard under Sa'd b. Hameed spotted the Tang forces and opted to hold their ground by digging trenches and forming a densely packed shield and spear formation. They held out until the main army under the command of Ziyad arrived, forcing the Tang forces to retreat to Taraz.

The sequence of the first three days of the battle were similar to each other, with the Chinese attacking first from the front, with their archers and crossbowmen dealing substantial damage to the Arab archers with greater accuracy and ranged superiority in crossbows. For five days, the two armies fought to a stalemate using similar tactics. They formed a shield wall with their infantry, behind which the archers shot volleys of arrows. Occasionally cavalry would charge the enemy and attempt to make a breakthrough.

The Karluk mercenaries, two-thirds of the Tang army, defected to the Abbasids on the fifth day of the battle. Karluk troops attacked the Tang army from the rear while the main Abbasid forces attacked from the front. Gao's troops held out until nightfall before managing to retreat to their camp escape with some of his Tang regulars. Despite the defeat, Gao wanted to continue the battle the next day, however his lieutenant Li Siye convinced him that such a path would lead to their complete destruction. The next morning, the Tang forces started retreating eastward across the Tian Shan mountain range. While they were crossing the mountains, their former Ferghanese allies suddenly attacked them. With the help of Li Siye, who led what remained of the armored cavalry to cut a path out of the encirclement, Gao and many his officers managed to escape, but most of their troops were captured. Out of an estimated 10,000 or 20,000 Tang troops, less than 2,000 managed to return from Talas to their territory in central Asia. Despite losing the battle, Li did inflict heavy losses on the pursuing Arab army after being reproached by Duan Xiushi.

==== Islamic account ====
Islamic sources give a different account of the battle. According to these sources, the Tang aided the recently deposed Umayyad Caliphate against the Abbasids in Bukhara and Sogdiana. The two sides engaged in a contest over the Silk Road and its neighboring kingdoms, resulting in the battle in 751, where the Abbasids defeated the Tang army. According to al-Maqdisi and Ibn al-Athir, approximately, 45,000 to 50,000 Chinese soldiers were killed and 20,000 to 25,000 fell as captives. as Arabic sources claim that the Tang commander, Gao Xianzhi, was also killed in action during the battle. As this battle would not have been mentioned were it not for the fact that it determined the fate of Transoxiana, particularly in cultural and political terms. It marked the withdrawal of Tang political influence and the permanent retreat of Chinese civilization, as well as end of Tang expansion from Transoxania, leaving it to fall under the control of Islamic political power first, and then under the enduring influence of Islamic civilization in religion, thought, art, and traditions to this day. It also resulted in Tang being sidelined from the ongoing struggle between the Arabs and both the eastern and western Turks, bringing an end to the long-standing political, military, and economic cooperation between the Turks and the Tang Empire. This cooperation subsequently shifted from eastern to western Turkestan, meaning that after the battle the Turks changed their sphere of orientation and influence. They were left to confront Islamic power on their own, relying solely on their own efforts and resources. This led to their fragmentation, with some Turkic groups being allied with the Arabs while others opposed them for a long period, before eventually becoming integrated into Islamic civilization. Finally, the Tang Empire was compelled to accept Muslim control over the major international trade routes passing through Transoxania. These routes had long been the reason for China's involvement in Turkic affairs, but from this point onward, their various branches and paths came under Muslim control.

According to the 13th-century historian, Al-Dhahabi, the Karluks had always been allied with the Abbasid army and entered the battle on their side. Historian Filippo Donvito speculates that the Karluks were simply biding their time to get rid of their Chinese overlords, who had by that time a long history of conquest in Central Asia while the Arabs were still relative newcomers, regardless of what agreement they had with Ziyad.

== Aftermath ==
=== Strategic consequences ===
From one perspective, the battle has been interpreted to be of great significance. The Arab-Islamic civilization prevailed over the Chinese civilization in Transoxania, consolidating Abbasid control of the region and the Silk Road, severing the alliance between the Chinese and the Turks, leading the submission and Islamization of the Turkic principalities, and forcing the Tang withdraw from Central Asia west of Xinjiang, marking the decline of the Tang Empire. Another perspective argues that the battle was of no strategic importance. The Abbasid victory secured the permanent establishment of Islam up to the Amu Syr region and caused the decline of Central Asian Buddhism, but no significant loss or gain of territory occurred and the borders remained relatively unchanged. The Muslims continued to solidify their control over western Central Asia and the battle was viewed as a mere border skirmish. Relations between the Abbasids and the Tang went back to normal almost immediately and four visits by Arab envoys to the Tang court are recorded from 752 to 753. In 755, the An Lushan rebellion forced the Tang to withdraw troops from the Protectorate General to Pacify the West, ending their presence in Central Asia.

The Chinese historian Bai notes that at the same time that the Battle of Talas was taking place, the Tang also sent an army to Suyab and consolidated Chinese control over the Turgesh. Tang commander Feng Changqing, who replaced Gao Xianzhi, recaptured Gilgit two years later. Shash (Tashkent) re-established its vassal status in 753 when its ruler received titles from the Tang. Central Asian states under Muslim control, such as Samarkand, continued to request aid from the Tang against the Abbasids. Ferghana, which participated in the battle earlier, joined the central Asian auxiliaries with the Chinese army and entered Gansu under summons during the An Lushan Rebellion in 756.

In 752 CE, an embassy from the Afshin, which was a Sogdian title used for the ruler of Principality of Ushrusana, arrived at the Tang court requesting aid against the Abbasids. Emperor Xuanzong declined the request for military assistance, instead asking the Afshin to maintain peace in the region, possibly reflecting the Tang assessment of Abbasid military strength and a desire to avoid further conflict in Central Asia. While no direct Tang response against Ushrusana is recorded, according to al-Nasafi, Ziyad ibn Salih was dispatched by Abu Muslim against Barkath, described as a village in Ushrusana, where he killed the local dihqan, though it remains unclear whether these events were connected to the embassy. Chinese sources mentioned that In 754, all nine kingdoms of Western Turkestan sent petitions to the Tang to attack the Abbasids, which the Tang continued to turn down as it did for decades.

According to a text by Al-Maqdisi, one of the few Arabic sources on the battle that has survived, Abbasid general Abu Muslim took 5,000 Chinese prisoners and confiscated possessions from the Tang military camp. Abu Muslim prepared his forces to invade further into Tang controlled territory, however he was called back by the caliph As-Saffah to serve as governor of Khurasan. The Abbasids took the kingdom of Shash and coerced the Tang army to evacuate the Gilgit region. In spite of this, the Tang retained considerable influence over eastern Central Asia. In 753, Tang forces under Feng Changqing recovered the kingdoms of Little and Great Balur in the Gilgit region. They also appointed a Turgesh khan over the tribes in the former territory of the Western Turkic Khaganate.

After the Battle of Talas, Military and political cooperation was severed for a considerable period between the Tang dynasty and the Eastern Turkic princes. With Chinese removed from the battlefield, it became inevitable for the Turkic princes to face the Abbasids alone, which led to their division. A segment of them sided with the Arabs, convinced that there was no benefit in continuing the fight, while the other segment no longer posed a serious threat but was limited to conducting hit-and-run raids.

One of the outcomes of the Abbasid consolidation over Transoxania well into the mid-thirteen century, which Islam spread among the Turkic people. a small number of Karluks converted to Islam. However, the majority would not convert until the mid-10th century, when Sultan Satuq Bughra Khan established the Kara-Khanid Khanate. Despite fighting against the Tang in 751, the Tang continued to exert influence over the Karluks, who never again opposed the Chinese. In 752, the Karluk Yabghus sent two diplomatic missions to the Tang to cultivate closer relations, probably due to their unsuccessful efforts to overthrow the Uyghur Khaganate. In 753, the Karluk Yabghus submitted to the army of Cheng Qianli and accepted appointment as Tang bridle officials. In late 753, the Karluks captured Abuz Yabghu, a Tang general of Turkic descent who had defected to the Tongluo chief earlier in 743. As a reward, the Karluk Yabghu Tun Bilga was given the title of "Khagan of the Turgish" as well as the title of a Tang commandery prince on 22 October. An additional 130 tribal leaders who visited the Tang court were given substantial rewards, including official positions and material rewards. The Karluks' relationship with the Tang started drifting apart once again after the An Lushan Rebellion, and they migrated west. The Karluks expanded their settlements around Tian Shan, and also settled westwards in Abbasid-controlled Fergana and Tukharistan. Iron weapons continued to be exported to Tibet and China on the Silk Roads between Kuqa and Aksu near the Tarim Basin. Arabic sources record that in the 10th century Aksu and Fergana had markets for arms traders.

Caliph al-Saffah died in 754. Chinese sources record that his successor, the Abbasid caliph al-Mansur, sent his diplomatic delegations regularly to China. Al-Mansur's delegations were known in China as Khayi Tashi (Black Clothes).

During the reign of the Abbasid Caliph al-Mansur (140–158 AH/757–775 CE), the Abbasid forces re-established control over Transoxiana and ended the Tang military presence in the region. The Chinese were unable to form a successful alliance with the Turkic forces of Transoxiana against the Abbasids. As a result, Muslim forces faced only the armies of the Turkic rulers without Chinese support. The Turkic groups, lacking external support, were unable to mount effective resistance against the Abbasid forces, and their political cohesion weakened. They fragmented into smaller entities with limited regional influence, such as the Karluk principality east of the Syr Darya in 766 CE and the Oghuz in the same region. The Turkic groups were no longer able to form a unified military coalition or challenge Abbasid control of Transoxiana, and their activities were largely confined to occasional raids on its frontiers.

Following Tang's decline in the region in the early years of Caliph al-Mansur's reign, Turkic resistance to Abbasid authority weakened significantly. The Abbasids maintained a defensive posture against potential movements by the Eastern Turks and suppressed local unrest in the frontier region. During this period, the most notable conflict on the eastern frontier involved the Ferghana Kingdom. Its ruler, Fanran ibn Afrakfun, either attacked trade caravans, refused to pay tribute to al-Mansur, or resisted Islamic expansion. In response, Caliph al-Mansur dispatched Layth ibn Tarif, who besieged the ruler in his capital, Kashgar. After a sustained campaign, the ruler of Ferghana was forced to negotiate peace and agree to pay a substantial sum. He subsequently sent one of his men, known as Batijur, to Baghdad, likely either to finalize the settlement with the Abbasid court or as a hostage to guarantee compliance. According to Arabic sources, This action served to discourage other regional rulers from challenging Abbasid authority, particularly given concerns that the Tang forces might exploit regional instability to avenge their earlier defeat at Talas.

Caliph al-Mansur established friendly relations with the Chinese. Historical sources mention a series of successive Arab embassies after the Battle of Talas. in 756, Abu Ja'far al-Mansur provided the Chinese Emperor Xuanzong of Tang with a contingent of 3,000 to 4,000 soldiers to suppress the rebellion that erupted against him. After suppressing this rebellion, the Emperor allowed them to settle in China's most important cities as a reward for the assistance they provided to the Emperor. Over time, these Arabs married Chinese women, and a new generation emerged, from whom came the Muslims of China.

As a result of these good relations between both sides – the Abbasids and the Chinese – Arab merchants settled in China. They had a judge (qadi) who issued rulings according to Islamic law, led prayers, and performed Islamic rituals. The Chinese Empire granted Arabs special facilities for selling their goods, and the Emperor himself would order the purchase of some of these goods for his personal account. Thus, Arabs were able to penetrate deep into the country and practice trade with complete freedom. For a long time, Arabs found complete welcome there, to the extent that the shops of major Chinese merchants would supply Arab traders with all the products and fine manufactures they needed from their lands to be shipped in Arab caravans upon their return to the lands of Islam.

The Abbasids continued to send embassies to China and 13 diplomatic gifts are recorded between 752 and 798.

A massacre of foreign Muslim merchants by Tian Shengong, a former rebel who defected to the Tang, happened during the An Lushan rebellion in the Yangzhou massacre (760).

=== Later history ===
The Tibetan Empire began attacking China, during a period where the Tibetan army also conquered territory in the Hindu Kush and Pamir Mountains from Indian kingdoms and assisted the establishment of the eastern Indian Pala Empire in the latter half of the 8th century. Under the fifth Abbasid caliph Harun al-Rashid, a military alliance was established with the Tang and Uyghurs, who engaged the Tibetan army on the western Tibetan frontier with the Abbasids. At the same time, the Uyghurs fought the Tibetans along the Silk Road.

Buddhist expansion in Asia: Mahayana Buddhism first entered China during the Han dynasty through the Silk Road during the Kushan Empire's existence. Maritime and overland trade routes were interlinked and complementary, forming what scholars have called the "great circle of Buddhism".

Following the An Lushan rebellion, the diplomatic exchange between Buddhist Indian kingdoms and the Tang dynasty all but ceased. Prior to the An Lushan rebellion, between 640 and 750 diplomatic envoys from Indian kingdoms, often accompanied by Buddhist monks, had regularly visited the Tang court. Chinese Buddhism developed into an independent religion with distinct spiritual elements, such as Pure Land Buddhism and Zen. China became the center of East Asian Buddhism, creating a canon and spreading on to Japan and Korea. The Battle of Talas did not mark the end of Buddhism or Chinese influence in the region. The Buddhist Kara-Khitan Khanate defeated the Seljuk and Kara-Khanid Turks at the Battle of Qatwan in 1141, conquering a large part of central Asia from the Karluk Kara-Khanid Khanate during the 12th century. The Kara-Khitans also reintroduced the Chinese system of Imperial government, since China was still held in respect and esteem in the region among even the Muslim population, and the Kara-Khitans used Chinese as an official language. The Kara-Khitan rulers were called "the Chinese" by the Muslims.

=== Papermaking ===
According to the 11th-century historian Al-Thaʽālibī, Chinese prisoners captured at the Battle of Talas in 751 introduced paper manufacturing to Samarkand. They engaged in the craft of papermaking while living on land occupied by the Abbasids following Talas. However, this account is unlikely to be factual. Paper was already in use throughout Central Asia by the 8th century; paper fragments dating to the 4th and 5th centuries have been found in the areas of Turpan and Gaochang, and letters written in the Sogdian language between the 4th and 6th centuries have been found in Dunhuang and Loulan. One such letter was a communication with Samarkand. According to Jonathan Bloom, paper was used in Samarkand, and probably produced there, several decades before the battle. Several paper documents have also been discovered near Panjakent at Mount Mugh, a mountain stronghold, that likely predate the Muslim conquest of Transoxiana. They were either local or came from Buddhist monks active in the region. By the 8th century, Chinese paper was mostly made of bast fibers while Islamic papers were mostly made of rag fibers. Bloom suggests that papermakers were already active in Central Asia for quite some time and had learned to use rag fibers rather than bast fibers as their primary papermaking material.

No historic Chinese source records this transfer of technology through prisoners of war and no contemporary Arabic accounts of the transfer of paper exist. Du Huan, who was captured by the Abbasid army at the battle of Talas and upon his return to China published his travel writings, documented that Chinese crafts such as silk weaving were practiced by Chinese prisoners of war while living on territory controlled by the Abbasids. It may have been a convention to reference Chinese craftsmen, who had long been esteemed in Islamic lands, and Chinese paper remained a prized product for centuries. According to Al-Nadim, a writer in Baghdad during the 10th century, Chinese craftsmen made paper in Khorasan. It was only after the first paper mill was built in Baghdad in 794–795 that paper was manufactured throughout the Islamic world and paper started to replace papyrus.

== Modern evaluation ==
Among the earliest historians who proclaimed the importance of this battle was the Russian historian Vasily Bartold, according to whom: "The earlier Arab historians, occupied with the narrative of events then taking place in western Asia, do not mention this battle; but it is undoubtedly of great importance in the history of Western Turkestan as it determined the question which of the two civilizations, the Chinese or the Muslim, should predominate in the land [of Turkestan]."

As Bartold stated regarding the battle: "the battle determined that the Arab civilization should prevail over Chinese civilization in the lands beyond the river [Transoxiana], and the influence of this civilization remains evident in many cities of this region."

According to Bartold, during the first three centuries of Islam, al-Tabari was the chief source—which has survived to the present in a compilation by Ibn al Athir—which was brought down to 915. Neither Tabari nor early Arabic historical works make any mention of this; however, Athir's statement is confirmed by the Chinese History of the Tang Dynasty.

== See also ==
- Dayuan
- Sino-Arab relations
- Battle of Aksu (717)
- Islam in China
- History of Arabs in Afghanistan
- Islam during the Tang dynasty
- Muslim conquests
- Northern Silk Road
- War of the Heavenly Horses
- Mongol invasion of the Khwarazmian Empire
- Bakhtiyar Khalji's Tibet campaign
