= Gao Xianzhi =

Tang Dynasty general (died 756)

Chinese name
- Traditional Chinese: 高仙芝
- Simplified Chinese: 高仙芝
Transcriptions
Standard Mandarin
- Hanyu Pinyin: Gāo Xiānzhī
- Wade–Giles: Kao Hsien-chih

Korean name
- Hangul: 고선지
- Hanja: 高仙芝
Transcriptions
- Revised Romanization: Go Seonji
- McCune–Reischauer: Ko Sŏnji

Gao Xianzhi or Ko Sŏnji (died January 24, 756) was a general of Goguryeo descent during the Tang dynasty. He was known as a great commander during his lifetime. He is best known for taking part in a number of military expeditions to conquer the Western Regions, over the Pamir Mountains and reaching as far as the Talas River. In 751 he commanded the Tang forces during the Battle of Talas, fighting against the Abbasid Caliphate. The Tang defeat at the Talas River is considered to mark the end of both Tang western expansion and Abbasid eastern expansion.

Around the beginning of the year 756, Gao and fellow general Feng Changqing offended the powerful eunuch Bian Lingcheng (邊令誠) while defending the Tong Pass against the rebel An Lushan, who had rebelled in 755. Bian then accused Feng of cowardice and Gao of corruption, and both were executed.

== Early life ==
Gao Xianzhi was the son of Ko Sagye, a Goguryeo general. Goguryeo was defeated by Tang Dynasty in 668 AD and Ko Sagye was captured by the Tang army, which he then served under.

Gao Xianzhi was born in Tang's western regions. Historical records state that Gao Xianzhi was neither muscular nor particularly strong like other army officers and his father was constantly concerned about his son's poor health. However, he demonstrated great courage from an early age and possessed skills in horseriding and archery.

Gao Xianzhi's loyalty and bravery allowed him to net the position of general by his 20s and served with his father in Kashgar under the Protectorate General to Pacify the West. He successively served under the jiedushi Tian Renwan (田仁琬) and Gai Jiayun (蓋嘉運), but received no further promotions. However, Gai's successor Fumeng Lingcha (夫蒙靈詧) was impressed by him, and repeatedly recommended him to his superiors. By the end of Emperor Xuanzong of Tang's Kaiyuan era (727-741), Gao was serving as Fumeng's deputy.

== First western campaign ==
At that time, Lesser Bolü, a city state around modern Gilgit, Pakistan, was allied with the Tibetan Empire, and 20 city states around it also became Tibetan vassals. A Tibetan princess became the wife and queen of Lesser Bolü's king. Tian Renwan, Gai Jiayun, and Fumeng Lingcha had all tried to attack Lesser Bolü in the past, but were unable to defeat it. In 747, Gao Xianzhi led a three-pronged attack of 10,000 cavalry soldiers, surprising both Lesser Bolü and its Tibetan garrisons. Lesser Bolü's king and queen were captured and brought back to Tang.

However, Fumeng grew angry with Gao for directly reporting news of the victory to Emperor Xuanzong without first reporting to him, and threatened to kill him. The eunuch Bian Lingcheng, whom Xuanzong had sent to monitor Gao's forces, interceded on Gao's behalf and reported Fumeng's threats to Xuanzong. Xuanzong, in response, summoned Fumeng back to the capital Chang'an in the new year of 748 and promoted Gao to take over his position. Gao arrested several of Fumeng's subordinates for attacking him—fellow deputy military governor Cheng Qianli (程千里), and army officers Bi Sichen (畢思琛) and Wang Tao (王滔)—but then released them and allowed them to continue serving under him. He entrusted Feng Changqing as his assistant, often having Feng lead troops or, when he himself led troops in campaigns, had Feng in charge of the headquarters. Li Siye also first distinguished himself as an army officer under Gao.

As a result of Gao's first successful campaign, Tang began to contend for influence with the Abbasid Caliphate and Tibetan Empire in the area of modern northern Pakistan and Afghanistan. Around 72 regional Indian and Sogdian kingdoms became Tang vassals, ending the Tibetan dominion of the Pamir Mountains. During his service as jiedushi of Anxi, places such as Tokmak, Kucha, and Kashmir came under the protectorate's jurisdiction.

== Second campaign and Battle of Talas ==
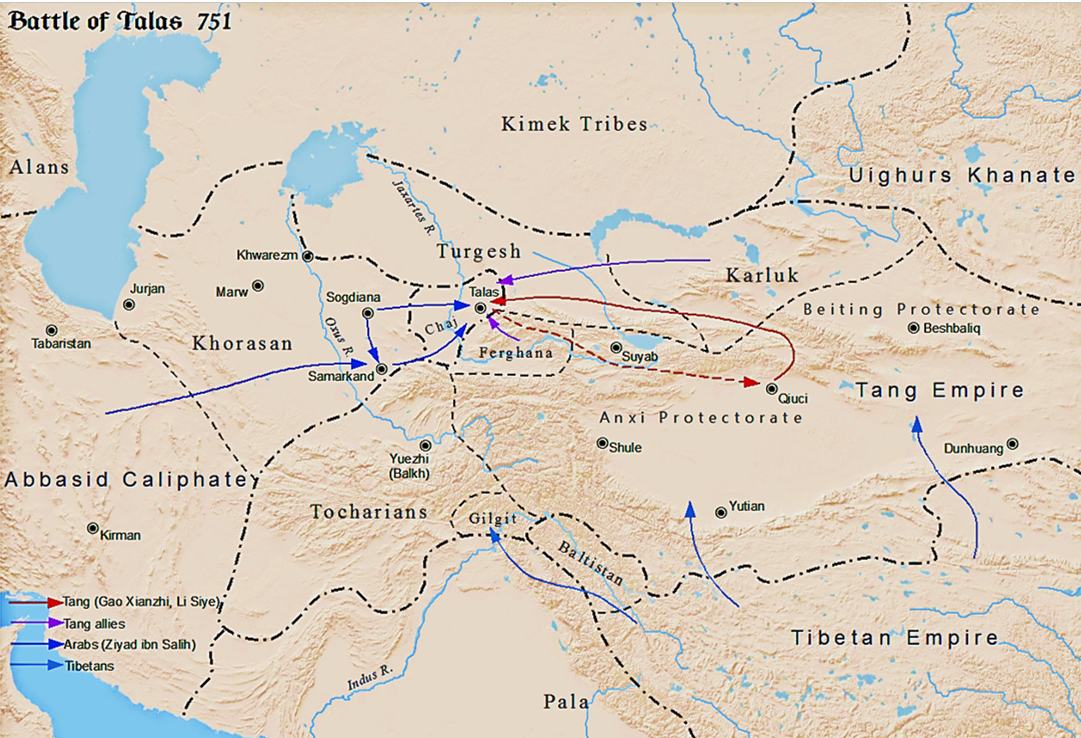
Battle of Talas

In late 749, Shilidaqieluo (失里怛伽羅), a prince of the Tuhuoluo (吐火羅, possibly Tocharians), reported to Tang that the king of Qieshi (朅師, the present day Chitral valley in Northern Pakistan), had been aligned with Tufan in pinning down Chinese forces stationed at Lesser Bolü, and suggested that Emperor Xuanzong send forces the region. In spring 750, Xuanzong sent Gao Xianzhi to attack Qieshi. Its king Botemo (勃特沒) was captured and Botemo's son Sujia (素迦) was crowned king. Gao then made a peace treaty with the state of Shi (石國, modern Tashkent, Uzbekistan) and once Shi stood down its defenses, attacked it without warning. The Shi king Chebishi (車鼻施) was captured and sent to Chang'an to be executed. This angered the nearby states, particularly after Gao slaughtered the old and weak captives. Gao also personally profited from the looting in battle—a large supply of diamonds, several camel-loads of gold, prized horses, and other treasures. In spring 751, Gao personally visited Chang'an, and, for his contributions, Xuanzong gave him the honorific title Kaifu Yitong Sansi (開府儀同三司) and was poised to move him to Hexi where the jiedushi An Sishun resisted to be ousted. However Xuanzong decided to allow An to remain at Hexi and Gao to remain at Anxi.

Meanwhile, a Shi prince had fled to the various states around the region and told them of Gao's treachery, causing them to align with the Abbasids. When Gao heard this, he made a pre-emptory attack with 30,000 soldiers against Abbasids, reaching a town of Atlakh (in modern Talas region of Kyrgyzstan) near the city of Talas (in modern Kazakhstan) and meeting Abbasid forces there. The armies fought bitterly for five days before the Turkic speaking Karluks turned against Gao. Tang forces were crushed and only a few thousand survived due to the efforts of Li Siye. Another subordinate of Gao who distinguished himself at the battle was Duan Xiushi, whom Gao recommended for promotion after the battle. The Talas conflict marked the end of Tang advances to the west, and the heavy losses by Abbasid forces despite the victory appeared to end Abbasid designs in the east as well. Gao was then made a commanding general of the imperial guards and Wang Zhengjian replaced him as jiedushi of Anxi. (Note: That Gao left his post at Anxi and became a general of the imperial guards was not explicitly stated in his biographies in the Old Book of Tang and the New Book of Tang, but Feng Changqing's biographies, contained in the same volumes, indicated that Wang Zhengjian (王正見) became the commander at Anxi, thus implying Gao was no longer at Anxi.) In 755, Gao was created the Duke of Miyun.

== Death ==
In 755, An Lushan, the jiedushi of Fanyang (范陽, headquartered in modern Beijing), rebelled against the Tang. Emperor Xuanzong nominally commissioned his son, Li Wan (李琬) the Prince of Rong, the commander of the forces against An's rebels, and put Gao Xianzhi in charge as Li Wan's deputy. Gao gathered 50,000 soldiers from the Chang'an region and took up position at Shang Commandery (陝郡, roughly modern Sanmenxia, Henan). Bian Lingcheng was made Gao's monitor.

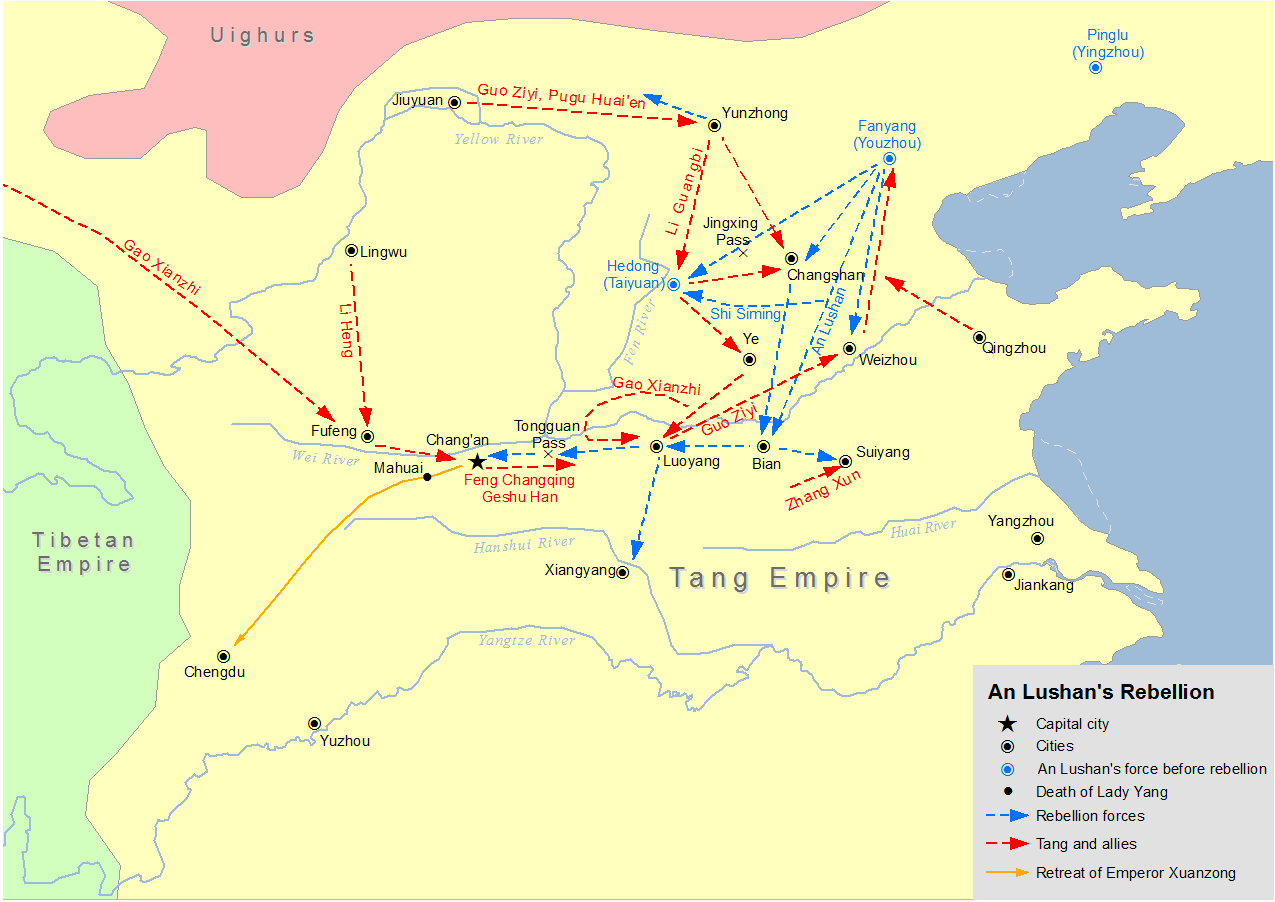
Map of An Lushan Rebellion and the campaign of Gao Xianzhi's force

Meanwhile, Feng Changqing was sent to the eastern capital Luoyang to prepare its defenses, but once Feng discovered upon arriving that he was given inadequate weapon supplies, and was defeated by the An army. Feng retreated to Shan, and suggested to Gao that Shan could not be easy defended, and so they should retreat to Tong Pass, which was a more suitable defensive position. Gao agreed, and the two of them took up position at Tong Pass. When An's forces attacked Tong Pass, they failed, and historians credited Gao with the improved defenses.

However, during the campaign, Gao had caused much offence against Bian, as Bian was making demands of him that he was not meeting. When Bian returned to Chang'an, he accused Feng of exaggerating An's strength, and accused Gao of improperly abandoning Shan as well as corruptly withholding food supplies and imperial rewards to soldiers for personal benefit. Xuanzong, believing Bian, issued edicts for Feng's and Gao's executions. After Bian returned to Tong Pass, he first read the edict for Feng's execution. Feng was beheaded, and upon the completion of that execution, Bian then read the second edict ordering Gao's execution. Gao cried out:

I retreated when I encountered the bandits [(i.e., An's army)], and I should die for this. But I swear to the heaven above and the earth below -- the accusations that I stole the food supplies and the imperial rewards are false!

The soldiers cried out for Gao as well, but Bian still beheaded Gao. As Gao was to be killed, he looked at Feng's body and stated:

Feng Er [(i.e., the second son from the Feng household, thus implying that Feng was the second son)], you became prominent from your low station. I promoted you to be my assistant, and you later succeeded me as jiedushi. It is fate that we die together here today.

== Legacy ==
Gao's defeat, which marked the end of Tang's expansion to the west, was partially fictionalized by the modern Chinese historian Bo Yang in the short story The Tashkent Massacre—the Chinese Were Cursed Here!, in which he gave a fictional curse by the queen of Shi, cursing Tang and the Chinese for eternity for Gao's treachery.
