= Protectorate General to Pacify the West =

Tang China protectorate (640 – c. 790)

Coordinates: 41°39′N 82°54′E

- Traditional Chinese: 安西大都護府
- Simplified Chinese: 安西大都护府
- Literal meaning: Pacify-West Grand Metropolitan-Protection Prefecture/Office
Transcriptions
Standard Mandarin
- Hanyu Pinyin: Ānxī Dàdūhù Fǔ

Protectorate to Pacify the West
- Traditional Chinese: 安西都護府
- Simplified Chinese: 安西都护府
- Literal meaning: Pacify-West Metropolitan-Protection Prefecture/Office
Transcriptions
Standard Mandarin
- Hanyu Pinyin: Ānxī Dūhù Fǔ
- Wade–Giles: Anhsi Tuhu Fu

Territory of Tang dynasty at its peak in 661, Protectorate General to Pacify the West is labelled in the left

The Protectorate General to Pacify the West (Anxi Grand Protectorate), initially the Protectorate to Pacify the West (Anxi Protectorate), was a protectorate (640 – c. 790) established by the Chinese Tang dynasty in 640 to control the Tarim Basin. The head office was first established at the prefecture of Xi, now known as Turpan, but was later shifted to Qiuci (Kucha) and situated there for most of the period.

The Four Garrisons of Anxi in Kucha (Qiuci), Khotan (Yutian), Kashgar (Shule), and Karashahr (Yanqi) were installed between 648 and 658 as garrisons under the western protectorate. In 659, Sogdia, Ferghana, Tashkent, Bukhara, Samarkand, Balkh, Herat, Kashmir, the Pamirs, Tokharistan, and Kabul all submitted to the protectorate under Emperor Gaozong of Tang.

After the An Lushan Rebellion (755–763) was suppressed, the office of Protector General was given to Guo Xin, who defended the area and the four garrisons even after communication had been cut off from Chang'an by the Tibetan Empire. The last five years of the protectorate are regarded as an uncertain period in its history, but most sources agree that the last vestiges of the protectorate and its garrisons were defeated by Tibetan forces by 790, ending nearly 150 years of Tang influence in Central Asia.

== History ==
=== 7th century ===
Emperor Taizong's campaign against Xiyu states

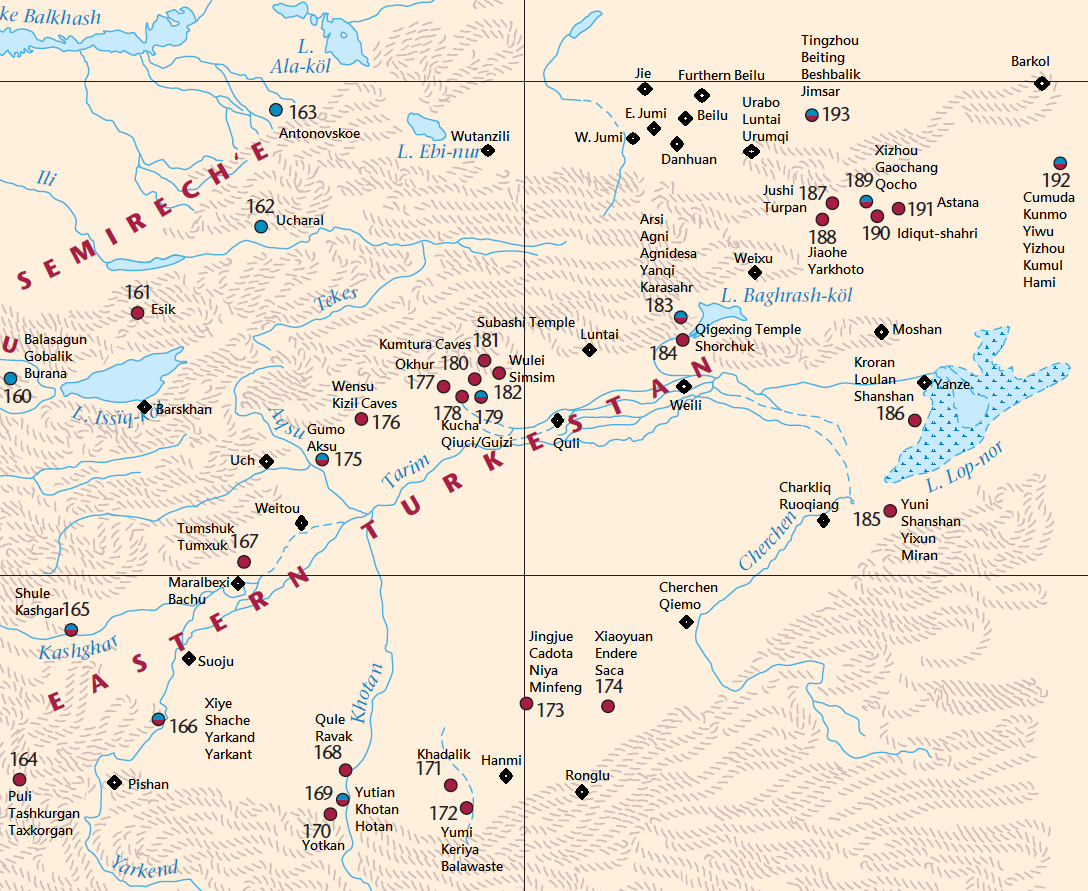
Historical cities of the Tarim Basin

The Western Regions during the Tang era were known as Qixi (磧西). Qi refers to the Gobi Desert while Xi refers to the west. In 632 the oasis kingdoms of Khotan (Yutian) and Shule (Kashgar) submitted to the Tang dynasty as vassals. In 635 Yarkand (Shache) submitted to the Tang dynasty.

On 19 September 640 Hou Junji of Tang conquered Gaochang and set up Xi Prefecture (西州) in its place. Xi Prefecture became the seat of the Anxi Protectorate on 11 October. Qiao Shiwang became the first protector general of the Anxi and served from 640 to 642. Guo Xiaoke received the next post and served from 640 to 648. By 644 Karasahr was also conquered, and was known to the Chinese as Yanqi. Aksu (Gumo) was garrisoned by Tang troops.

Kucha, known to the Chinese as Qiuci, allied with the rebellious Yanqi and threatened the Tang's expansion. In 648, the Tang conquered Yanqi and Qiuci. Qiuci became the new seat of Anxi under the governance of Chai Zhewei from 649 to 651. By 650 the entire Western Region had submitted to Tang authority. In 651 the seat was moved back to Xi Prefecture where it remained under the governance of Qu Zhizhan from 651 to 658. In 656 the Tibetan Empire attacked Lesser Bolü in Gilgit southwest of the protectorate.

In 658 the seat was moved back to Qiuci after Su Dingfang defeated the Western Turkic Khaganate. Its title was changed to "Grand Protectorate" and granted governorship of former Western Turkic territories, which were further separated into the Mengchi and Kunling protectorates. In 660 the Tibetan Empire and their Turkic allies attacked Shule. The Tibetan Empire also attacked Wakhan to the protectorate's southwest. When the Tang general boasted of the size of his army, Gar Tongtsen Yulsung's son responded in the following manner:

There is no disputing the matter of numbers. But many small birds are the food of a single hawk, and many small fish are the food of a single otter. A pine tree has been growing for a hundred years, but a single axe is its enemy. Although a river runs ceaselessly, it can be crossed in a moment by a boat six feet long. Although barley and rice grow over a whole plain, it is all the grist of a single mill. Although the sky is filled with stars, in the light of a single sun they are nothing.

In 663 the Tibetan Empire conquered Tuyuhun southeast of the protectorate. They also attacked Yutian but were repelled. In 665 the Tibetan Empire and Turkic allies attacked Yutian. The conflict between the Tang and Tibetans was the primary context under which the story of a Khotanese princess striving to rescue Khotan from destruction was formulated. One passage of the story in prayer form reads:

When the red-faced ones and the Chinese battle each other, may Khotan not be destroyed. When monks come from other countries to Khotan, may they not be treated dishonourably. May those who flee here from other countries find a place to stay here and help to rebuild the great stupas and monastic gardens that have been burned by the red-faced ones.

In 670 the Tibetan Empire routed a Tang army at the Battle of Dafei River and attacked Gumo as well as captured Qiuci. The protectorate's seat was moved to Suyab, known as Suiye to the Chinese, in modern Kyrgyzstan. In 673 the Tang consolidated control over the Wuduolu Turks living in the area that came to be known as Dzungaria. The Tang attacked collaborators of the Tibetan Empire in Shule and Gongyue (Kongul, a Turkic tribe). The king of Yutian expeled the Tibetan forces in 674 and the seat of the protectorate was moved back to Qiuici after its king pledged loyalty to the Tang. In 677 Ashina Duzhi, previously a Tang general tasked with controlling the Wuduolu Turks, rebelled and declared himself Onoq Khagan, ruler of all Turks. He captured Qiuci with the help of the Tibetans. A Tang army of 180,000 won an initial victory against the Tibetans at Koko nor but was subsequently defeated. In 679 Tang envoys traveled to Tibet for negotiations while Tang forces mounted a surprise attack to recapture the Four Garrisons. At the same time, the Tang general, Pei Xingjian, was accompanying Narsieh on an expedition to reclaim Persia before abandoning him in the Western Regions to fight the Turks. Pei defeated Ashina Duzhi in an ambush attack and re-established control over the Western Regions. A stele was set up in Suiye commemorating the victory: "They had brought supplies for ten days, but they captured their opponent, Duzhi, right away, and then almost instantaneously captured Li Zhefu as well. Both Chinese and foreign people celebrated the victory together, setting up a stele in Suyab."

According to Christopher I. Beckwith, between 670-692, the Tang did not recapture the Western Regions and controlled only Suiye (after 692) and Xi Prefecture. Beckwith argues that the king of Yutian that submitted to the Tang in 675 was actually a refugee fleeing from the Tibetans and there is no evidence of Tang military action in this region at this time. The king died at the Tang court and his son was still there in 691. However, Kucha remained outside of Tibetan control and the Tibetans attacked Kucha in 687.

In 682, the Turkic leaders Ashina Chebao and the Three Tribes of Yanmian rebelled. Ashina Chebao was defeated by Wang Fangyi, a subordinate of Pei Xingjian, at Gongyue near Ting Prefecture while the Yanmian tribes were ambushed at Rehai (Issyk-Kul).

In 686 Tang troops withdrew from the Four Garrisons after elements within the court argued for the decrease of military expenditures. In 687 the Tibetan Empire established control over the Western Regions. After suppressing rebellious Tang princes against her rule, Empress Wu Zetian decided to reassert control over the Western Regions in 689. She commanded the prefect of Lanzhou to recapture Shule (Kashgar). However the general was reluctant to commit to the expedition and took another one and a half years to attack the Tibetans. In 690 the Tibetan Empire defeated the Tang army at Issyk-Kul. Another failed attempt at regaining the Western Regions was made in 691.

In 692, the command of a Tang army was given to Wang Xiaojie, who was well acquainted with Tibet after living there for some time. Wang retook the Western Regions from the Tibetan Empire and re-established the Anxi Protectorate at Qiuci, where it would remain until the protectorate's demise around 790. According to the Old Book of Tang, Shule had been destroyed by the Tibetans. However by 698, envoys from the king of Shule offered gifts to the Tang. The Tang later sent someone to bestow investiture on the king of Shule in 728. The importance of the Western Regions was well understood by the Tang court at this point. Its strategic significance is summarized by Cui Rong, an Imperial Diarist of the court,

If we cannot defend these garrisons, barbarians will surely come to destabilize the Western Regions. And various tribes south of the Nanshan Mountain [i.e., the Qilian and the Kunlun Mountains] would feel threatened. If they link up with one another, they would pose a threat to regions west of the Yellow River [i.e., present-day Gansu and Qinghai provinces]. Moreover, if they get in touch with the Turks in the north, our soldiers will be unable to crush them by crossing the Moheyan Desert [the desert northwest of Dunhuang] that extends over 2,000 li, where neither water nor grass can be found. The tribes [loyal to China] in Yizhou, Xiyzhou, Beiting [Beshbalik], and Anxi protectorates will all be eliminated.

— Cui Rong

In 694 the Tibetan Empire attacked the Stone City (Charklik in Ruoqiang County). Wang Xiaojie defeated 30,000 troops led by Gar Tsenyen Gungton and Ashina Tuizi. Han Sizhong, the Defender of Suiye, defeated 10,000 troops led by the Tibetan general Nishousijin/Nishumosicheng.

In 696, the Umayyad Caliphate offered a lion as tribute at Suiye, but it was refused because it was too expensive to transport the lion to Chang'an.

=== 8th century ===
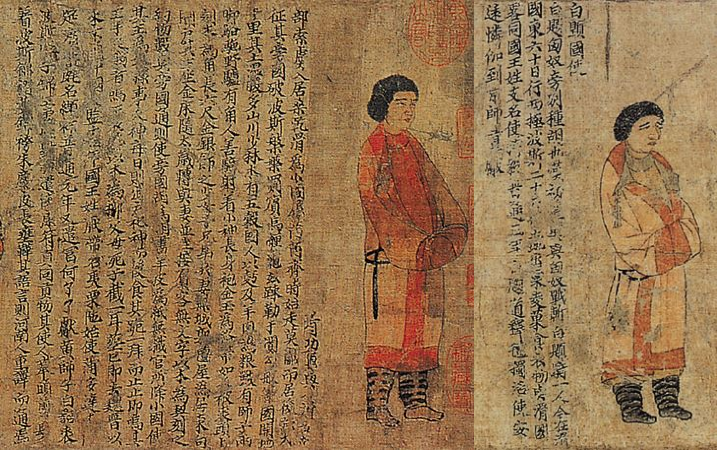
Hephthalite envoys 6th century AD.

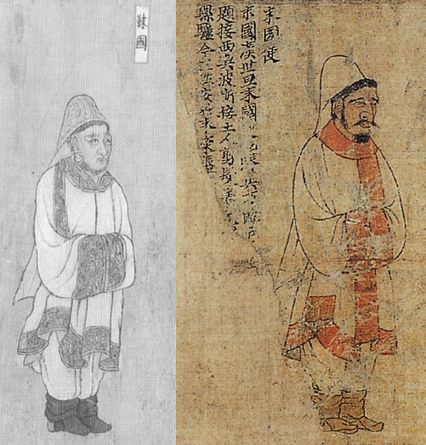
Tributary envoys from Qiemo, 6-7th centuries AD.

In 701, the Chinese poet Li Bai was born in Suiye (Suyab in modern Kyrgyzstan). His family was experiencing legal troubles, so they changed their names and escaped to Central Asia before returning to Guanghan (in modern Sichuan northeast of Chengdu) in 705.

In 702 Wu Zetian set up the Beiting Protectorate in Ting Prefecture (Jimsar County) and granted it governorship over Yi Prefecture (Hami) and Xi Prefecture. In 708 the Turgesh attacked Qiuci. In 710 the Tibetan Empire conquered Lesser Bolü.

In 715 the Tibetan Empire attacked Fergana, a Tang vassal. Arab sources claim Qutayba ibn Muslim briefly took Kashgar in 715 from China and withdrew after an agreement but some historians dismiss this claim. H. A. R. Gibb argues that Qutayba never reached Kashgar and his movements were restricted to the Ferghana valley and that a raid in 717 by Turkish soldiers was conflated with Qutayba's movements. Christopher I. Beckwith argues that there is no reason to reject the historicity of the raid on Kashgar. He references Ibn A'tham al-Kufi's account of Qutayba sending 7,000 troops under Kathir's command to raid Kashgar, where they inflicted casualties and took 100 captives. B. A. Litvinsky, A. H. Jalilov, and A. I. Kolesnikov describe the raid as having occurred. According to Christopher Baumer citing al-Tabari, Qutayba extracted a symbolic tribute from Kashgar, which he threatened with war. The king of Kashgar presented him with a golden box filled with earth and Qutayba returned to Merv.

The Arab Umayyad Caliphate in 715 AD deposed Ikhshid, the king the Fergana Valley, and installed a new king Alutar on the throne. The deposed king fled to Kucha (seat of Anxi Protectorate) and sought Chinese intervention. The Chinese sent 10,000 troops under Zhang Xiaosong to Ferghana. He defeated Alutar and the Arab occupation force at Namangan and reinstalled Ikhshid on the throne.

In 717 the Tibetan Empire attacked Gumo and the Stone City.

General Tang Jiahui led the Chinese to defeat the following Arab-Tibetan attack in the Battle of Aksu (717). The attack on Aksu was joined by Turgesh Khan Suluk. Both Uch Turfan and Aksu were attacked by the Turgesh, Arab, and Tibetan force on 15 August 717. Qarluqs serving under Chinese command, under Ashina Xian, a Western Turkic Qaghan serving under the Chinese Assistant Grand Protector General Tang Jiahui defeated the attack. Al-Yashkuri, the Arab commander and his army fled to Tashkent after they were defeated.

In 719 the Turgesh captured Suiye. In 720 the Tibetan Empire seized the Stone City. In the same year Tang bestowed titles upon the kings of Khuttal, Chitral, and Oddiyana In 722 Tang restored the king of Lesser Bolü to his throne. In 725 the king of Khotan (Yutian) rebelled but was immediately replaced with a Tang puppet by protectorate forces.

In 726 the Turgesh attempted to engage in horse trade at Qiuci without prior authorization. The Turgesh Khagan Suluk used his marital relation with Princess Jiaohe to issue a decree ordering the Protector-General to engage in trade. However Princess Jiaohe was actually the daughter of Ashina Huaidao, and the Protector-General retorted: "How can an Ashina woman proclaim a decree to me, a military commissioner?!" In response Suluk attacked Qiuci.

In 727 and 728 the Tibetan Empire attacked Qiuci. In 737 the Tibetan Empire conquered Lesser Bolü. In 741 the Tibetan Empire sacked the Stone City. In 745 the Tang general Huangfu Weiming attacked the Stone City but suffered a major defeat. According to Huangfu, the Stone City was one of the most heavily defended bastions of the Tibetan Empire,

Shih-pao is strongly defended. The whole Tibetan nation is guarding it. Now if we array our troops below it, we cannot capture it without several tens of thousands of [our] men being killed. I am afraid that what would be gained is not comparable to what would be lost.

— Huangfu Weiming

The Anxi Protectorate and main contemporary Asian polities, circa 720

In 747 the Tang general Gao Xianzhi captured Lesser Bolü and its king. A garrison was established to station a thousand fresh recruit and he renamed the country Guiren (Returning to Benevolence). In 748 the Tang recaptured Suiye and destroyed it. In 749 Tang recovered the Stone City. In 750 the Tang intervened in a dispute between their vassal Fergana and the neighboring kingdom of Chach, located in modern Tashkent. The kingdom of Chach was sacked and their king was taken back to Chang'an, where he was executed. In the same year Tang also defeated Qieshi in Chitral and the Turgesh.

In 751 Tang forces suffered a major defeat at the Battle of Talas against Abbasid and Karluk forces. Although the Battle of Talas saw the limit of Tang expansion to the west, the importance of the defeat at the Battle of Talas has sometimes been exaggerated. Although the Tang army was defeated, the Arabs did not extend their influence into Xinjiang, and the Karluks remained amiable to the Tang. Some Karluks converted to Islam, but the vast majority did not until the mid 10th century under Sultan Satuq Bughra Khan of the Kara-Khanid Khanate. The long-term strategic importance of Talas was overshadowed later on by the An Lushan Rebellion, which devastated the Tang homeland. It is now understood as the primary cause for the Tang retreat from Central Asia.

My relative Huan followed Go Seonji [Tang general of Goguryeo (Korean) descent; Gao Xianzhi...], the military commissioner of Zhenxi (modern Xinjiang), to go on a western expedition. In the tenth year of Tianbao (751) he reached the Western Sea. At the beginning of the Baoying reign (761) he boarded a merchant ship and returned [to China] through Guangzhou, and wrote his Travel Record.

— Du You (735–812), a relative of Du Huan

In 753 Tang forces defeated Baltistan (Greater Bolü).

In 754 Tang forces defeated Tibetan forces at Boxian.

In 755 the An Lushan Rebellion occurred and the Tang dynasty withdrew 200,000 soldiers from the Western Regions to protect the capital. In 763 the Tibetan Empire conquered Yanqi. In the same year the Tang capital was briefly taken by the Tibetans before they were forced to retreat.

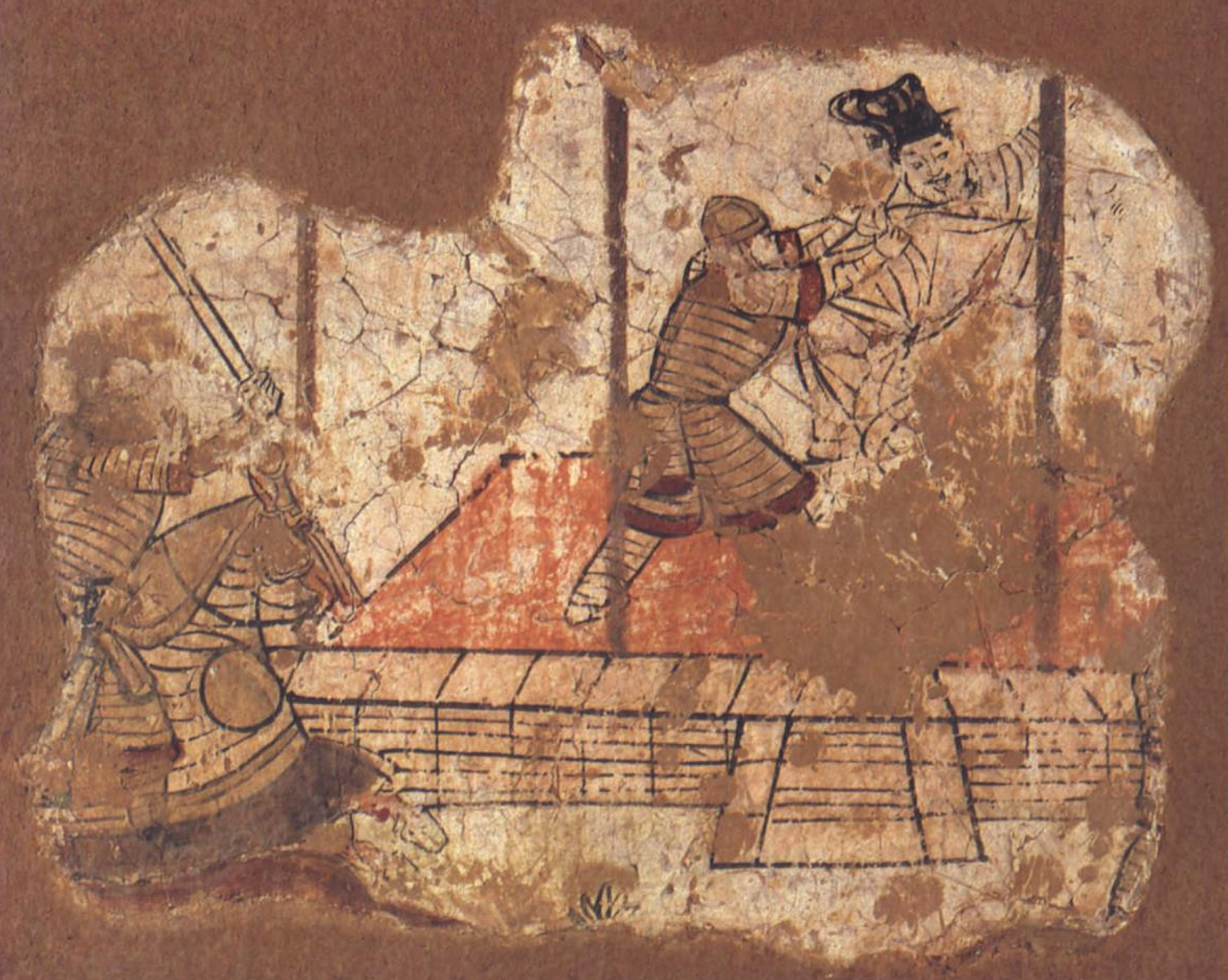
Dignitary seized by soldiers. Kumtura painting, 8th–9th century CE.

In 764 the Tibetan Empire invaded the Hexi Corridor and conquered Liang Prefecture, cutting off the Anxi and Beiting protectorates from the Tang dynasty. However Anxi and Beiting were left relatively unmolested under the leadership of Guo Xin and Li Yuanzhong.

In 780 Guo Xin and Li Yuanzhong were officially made protectorate generals after sending secret messages to Emperor Dezong of Tang.

In 787 the Tibetan Empire conquered Qiuci. In 789 the monk Wukong passed through Shule, Yutian, Gumo, Qiuci, Yanqi, and Ting Prefecture and found that they all had Chinese commanders and were free from Tibetan or Uyghur control. Shule was garrisoned by Lu Yang, Yutian by Zheng Ju, Gumo (Weirong/Bohan/Buhu and Jusede/Tumxuk) by Su Cen and Jia Quan, Qiuci by Guo Xin, Yanqi by Yang Riyou, and Ting Prefecture by Yang Xigu. This contradicts the previous conquests of Yanqi and Qiuci by the Tibetan Empire in 763 and 787, assertions made by Yuri Bregel in his An Historical Atlas of Central Asia.

In 792 the Tibetan Empire conquered Yutian. It is unclear what happened to Shule (Kashgar), Shache (Yarkand), or Gumo (Aksu). According to O. Pritsak, Kashgar came under Karluk domination around this time, but this is disputed by Christopher I. Beckwith.

== Post-Tibetan domination ==
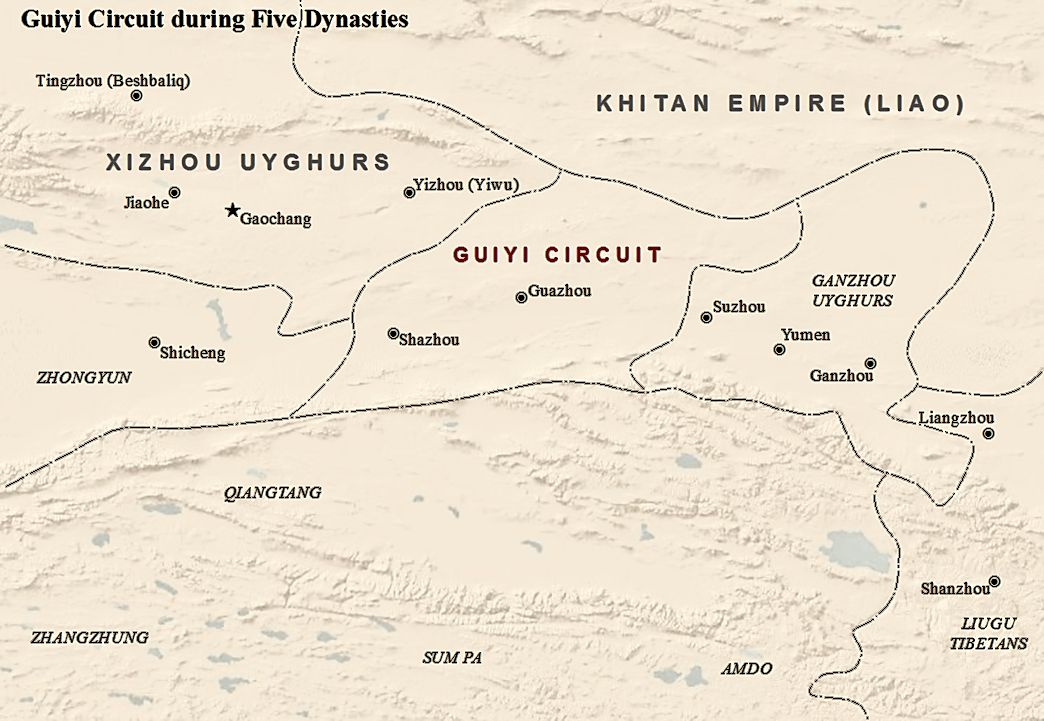
Qocho, Guiyi Circuit, and the Ganzhou Uyghur Kingdom post-Tibetan Empire.

Regarding Khurasan and its proximity to the land of China, between the latter and Sogdiana there is a journey of two months. The way, however, is via a forbidding desert of unbroken sand dunes in which there are no water sources and no river valleys, with no habitation nearby. That is what prevents the people of Khurasan from launching an assault on China. Turning to the part of China lying in the direction of the setting sun, namely the place known as Bamdhu, this is located on the borders of Tibet, and fighting never ceases there between the Chinese and the Tibetans.

— Abu Zayd al-Sirafi

Of the four garrisons that made up the defunct Anxi Protectorate, all eventually ended up freeing themselves or coming under the dominion of other powers by the mid-9th century. Karasahr and Kucha were occupied by the Kingdom of Qocho in 843. Kashgar came under the dominion of the Kara-Khanid Khanate. The earliest approximate date of around the late 8th or early 9th century is disputed, but it was likely before 980. Khotan regained its independence in 851. By 1006 it was also conquered by the Kara-Khanid Khanate.

== List of protector generals ==
List of grand and assistant protector generals of the Protectorate General to Pacify the West (Anxi) (ethnicity in square brackets):

Protectorate:

- Qiao Shiwang (喬師望) 640–642
- Guo Xiaoke (郭孝恪) 642–649
- Chai Zhewei (柴哲威) 649–651
- Qu Zhizhan (麴智湛) [Gaochang (Sinic)] 651–658

Grand Protectorate:

- Yang Zhou (楊胄) 658–662
- Su Haizheng (蘇海政) 662
- Gao Xian (高賢) 663
- Pilou Shiche (匹婁武徹) [Xianbei] 664
- Pei Xingjian (裴行儉) 665–667

Protectorate:

- Tao Dayou (陶大有) 667–669
- Dong Baoliang (董寶亮) 669–671
- Yuan Gongyu (袁公瑜) 671–677
- Du Huanbao (杜懷寶) 677–679,
- Wang Fangyi (王方翼) 679–681
- Du Huanbao (杜懷寶) 681–682
- Li Zulong (李祖隆) 683–685

Grand Protectorate:

- Wang Shiguo (王世果) 686–687
- Yan Wengu (閻溫古) 687–689

Protectorate:

- Jiu Bin (咎斌) 689–690
- Tang Xiujing (唐休璟) 690–693

Grand Protectorate:

- Xu Qinming (許欽明) 693–695
- Gongsun Yajing (公孫雅靖) 696–698
- Tian Yangming (田揚名) 698–704
- Guo Yuanzhen (郭元振) 705–708,
- Zhou Yiti (周以悌) 708–709
- Guo Yuanzhen (郭元振) 709–710
- Zhang Xuanbiao (張玄表) 710–711
- Lu Xuanjing (呂玄璟) 712–716
- Guo Qianguan (郭虔瓘) 715–717,
- Li Cong (李琮) 716
- Tang Jiahui (湯嘉惠) 717–719,
- Guo Qianguan (郭虔瓘) 720–721
- Zhang Xiaosong (張孝嵩) 721–724
- Du Xian (杜暹) 724–726
- Zhao Yizhen (趙頤貞) 726–728
- Xie Zhixin (謝知信) 728
- Li Fen (李玢) 727–735
- Zhao Hanzhang (趙含章) 728–729
- Lu Xiulin (吕休琳) 729–730
- Tang Jiahui (湯嘉惠) 730
- Lai Yao (萊曜) 730–731
- Xu Qinshi (徐欽識) 731–733
- Wang Husi (王斛斯) 733–738
- Ge Jiayun (蓋嘉運) 738–739
- Tian Renwan (田仁琬) 740–741
- Fumeng Lingcha (夫蒙靈詧) [Qiang (Tibetic)] 741–747
- Gao Xianzhi (高仙芝) [Gorguryeo] 747–751
- Wang Zhengjian (王正見) 751–752

Protectorate:

- Feng Changqing (封常清) 752–755
- Liang Zai (梁宰) 755–756
- Li Siye (李嗣業) 756–759
- Lifei Yuanli (荔非元禮) [Qiang (Tibetic)] 759–761
- Bai Xiaode (白孝德) 761–762
- Sun Zhizhi (孫志直) 762–765
- Zhu Mou (朱某) 765–?
- Er Zhumou (爾朱某) [Xianbei] 765–778
- Guo Xin (郭昕) 762–808

== Legacy ==
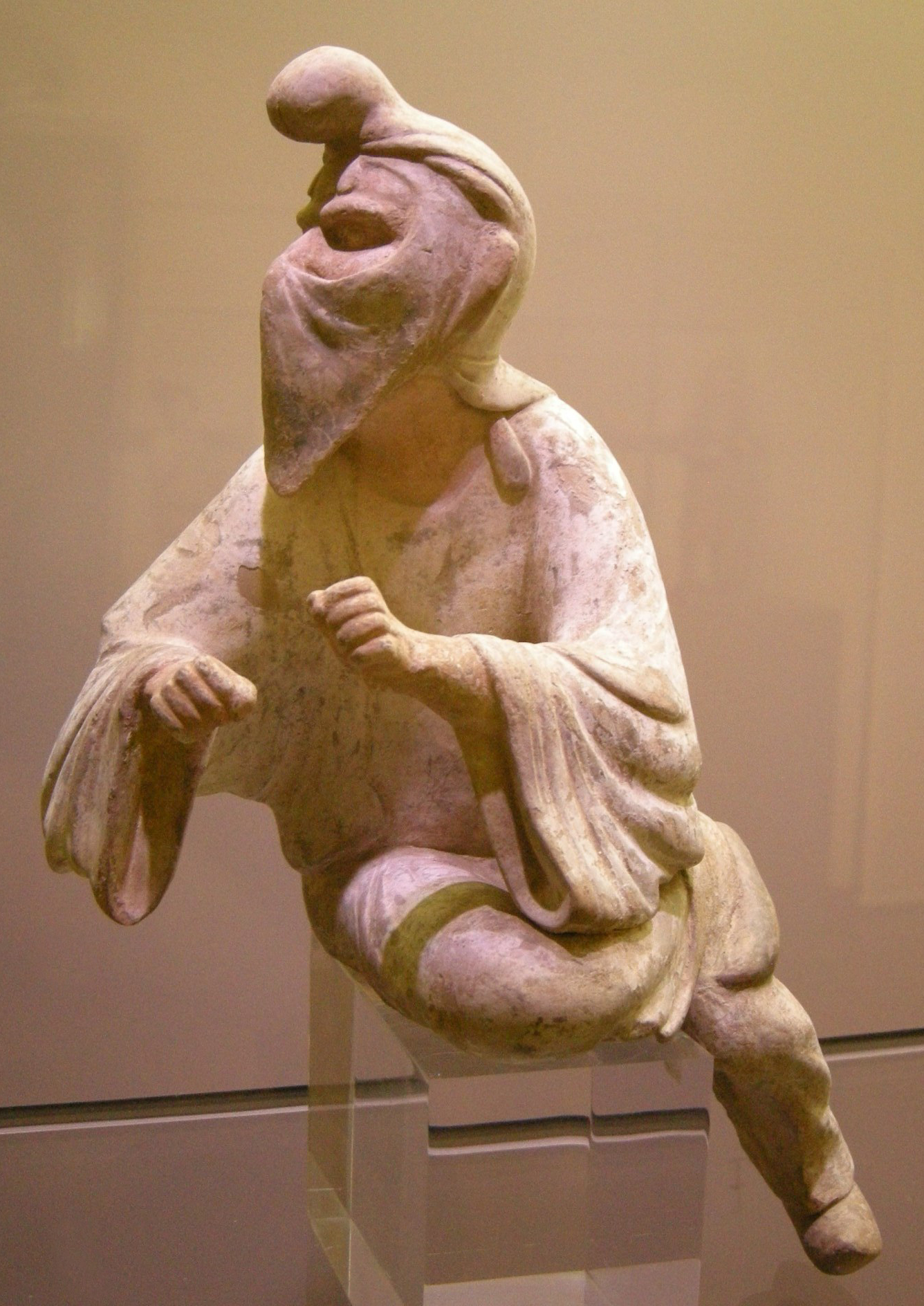
An 8th-century Tang dynasty Chinese clay figurine of a Sogdian man (an Eastern Iranian person) wearing a distinctive cap and face veil, possibly a camel rider or even a Zoroastrian priest engaging in a ritual at a fire temple, since face veils were used to avoid contaminating the holy fire with breath or saliva; Museum of Oriental Art (Turin), Italy.

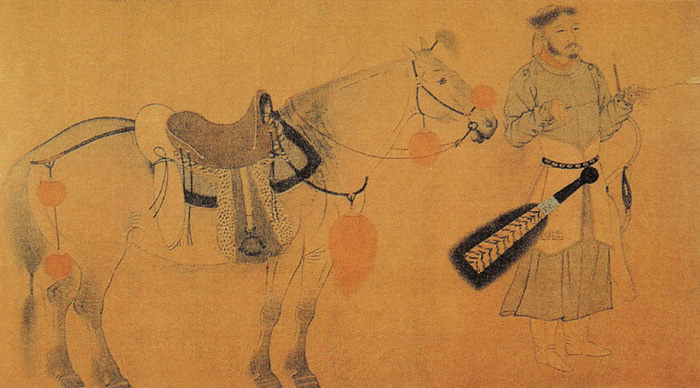
A painting of Yelü Bei, eldest son of Abaoji, the founder of the Liao dynasty.

=== Physical remains ===
In Xinjiang and the Chu valley in Central Asia, Tang era Chinese coins continued to be copied and minted after the Chinese left the area. Coins with both Chinese and Kharosthi inscriptions have been found in the southern Tarim Basin.

=== Linguistic influence ===
The military dominance of the Tang in Central Asia has been used as an explanation for the Turkic word for China, "Tamghaj", possibly derived from the "House of Tang" (Tangjia) instead of Tabgatch.

=== Cultural influence ===
Chinese arts and crafts such as the sancai "three color" glaze left a long lasting impression in Central Asia and Western Eurasia.

In the Persian epic Shahnameh the Chin refers to China or Chinese Turkestan which was under Tang control. The Khan of Turkestan was referred to as the Khan of Chin.

Aladdin, an Arabic Islamic story which is set in China, may have been referring to Central Asia under Tang influence.

=== Political influence ===
Steppe empires often utilized the prestige of the Tang by connecting themselves to the defunct dynasty. The Qara Khitan khans used the title of "Chinese emperor" while the Khara-Khanid khans called themselves Tabgach. Tabgach Khan, or "Khan of China" was a common appellation among Khara-Khanid rulers. Persian, Arab and other western Asian writers came to call China by the name "Tamghaj".

In 1124 the westward migration of the Khitans under Yelü Dashi also consisted of a large population of Han Chinese, Balhae, Jurchen, Mongols, Khitan, in addition to the Xiao consort clan and the Yelü royal family In the 12th century, the Qara Khitai defeated the Kara-Khanid Khanate and conquered their territory in Central Asia. The Khitan rulers, called "the Chinese" by Muslims, governed using Chinese as their official language as well as the Chinese style of imperial government. The effect of their administration was seen with respect and esteem due in part to China's status in Central Asia at the time. The Chinese characteristics appealed to the Muslim Central Asians and helped validate Qara Khitai rule. Han Chinese population among them was comparatively small so it is unlikely that the Chinese characteristics were kept to appease them. Later the Mongols moved more Chinese into Beshbalik, Almaliq and Samarqand in Central Asia to work as artisans and farmers.

The "image of China" played a key role in legitimizing the Khitan rule to the Central Asian Muslims. Prior to the Mongol invasions, the perception of China among Central Asian Muslims was an extremely civilized society, known for its unique script, its expert artisans, justice and religious tolerance. The Chinese, Turk, Arab, Byzantine, and Indian rulers were known as the world's "five great kings". The historical memory of Tang China was powerful enough that anachronistic expressions appeared in Muslim writings long after the end of the Tang. China was known as chīn (چين) in Persian and as ṣīn (صين) in Arabic while the Tang dynasty capital Changan was known as Ḥumdān (خُمدان).

Some Muslim writers like Marwazī, Mahmud Kashghārī and Kashgari viewed Kashgar as part of China. Ṣīn [i.e., China] is originally threefold; Upper, in the east which is called Tawjāch; middle which is Khitāy, lower which is Barkhān in the vicinity of Kashgar. But know Tawjāch is known as Maṣīn and Khitai as Ṣīn" China was called after the Tuoba rulers of the Northern Wei by the Turks, pronounced by them as Tamghāj, Tabghāj, Tafghāj or Tawjāch. India introduced the name Maha Chin (greater China) which influenced the two different names for China in Persian as chīn and māchīn (چين ماچين) and Arabic ṣīn and māṣīn (صين ماصين), Southern China at Guangzhou was known as Chin while Northern China's Chang'an was known as Machin, but the definition switched and the south was referred to as Machin and the north as Chin after the Tang dynasty. As a result of Tang China's control over Kashgar, some Kashghārī placed Kashgar within the definition of China, Ṣīn, whose emperor was titled as Tafghāj or Tamghāj, Yugur (yellow Uighurs or Western Yugur) and Khitai or Qitai were all classified as "China" by Marwazī while he wrote that Ṣīnwas was bordered by placed SNQU and Maṣīn. Machin, Mahachin, Chin, and Sin were all names of China. According to Fakhr al-Dīn Mubārak Shāh, "Turkestan", Balasagun, and Kashghar were identified with where Chīn (China) was located.

Marwazī considered Transoxania to be a former part of China, retaining the legacy of Tang Chinese rule over Transoxania in Muslim writings, In ancient times all the districts of Transoxania had belonged to the kingdom of China [Ṣīn], with the district of Samarqand as its centre. When Islam appeared and God delivered the said district to the Muslims, the Chinese migrated to their [original] centers, but there remained in Samarqand, as a vestige of them, the art of making paper of high quality. And when they migrated to Eastern parts their lands became disjoined and their provinces divided, and there was a king in China and a king in Qitai and a king in Yugur. Some Muslim writers considered the Qara Khitai, the Ganzhou Uighur Kingdom and Kashgar as all parts of "China". After Yusuf Qadir Khan's conquest of new land in Altishahr towards the east, he adopted the title "King of the East and China".

=== Qocho ===
The Tang era of Gaochang, later Qocho and Turpan, left a lasting legacy upon the Buddhist Uyghur Kingdom of Qocho. Tang names appear on more than 50 Buddhist temples. Emperor Taizong's edicts were stored in the "Imperial Writings Tower" and Chinese dictionaries like the Jingyun, Yuian, Tang yun, and da zang jing (Buddhist scriptures) were also stored inside the Buddhist temples. Persian monks also maintained a Manichaean temple in the Qocho. The Persian Hudud al-'Alam referred to Qocho as the "Chinese town".

The Turpan Buddhist Uyghurs of the Kingdom of Qocho continued to produce the Chinese Qieyun rime dictionary and developed their own pronunciations of Chinese characters, left over from the Tang influence over the area.

In Central Asia the Uyghurs viewed the Chinese script as "very prestigious" so when they developed the Old Uyghur alphabet, based on the Syriac script, they deliberately wrote it vertically like with Chinese writing.

== Modern culture ==
The Anxi Protectorate is featured in the Jade Dragon expansion for the grand strategy game Crusader Kings II.

== Gallery ==
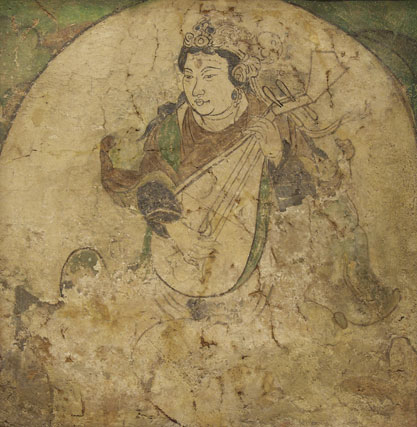
A feitian playing pipa, wall painting from Kizil, pigment on stucco, Tang dynasty, 600–800.

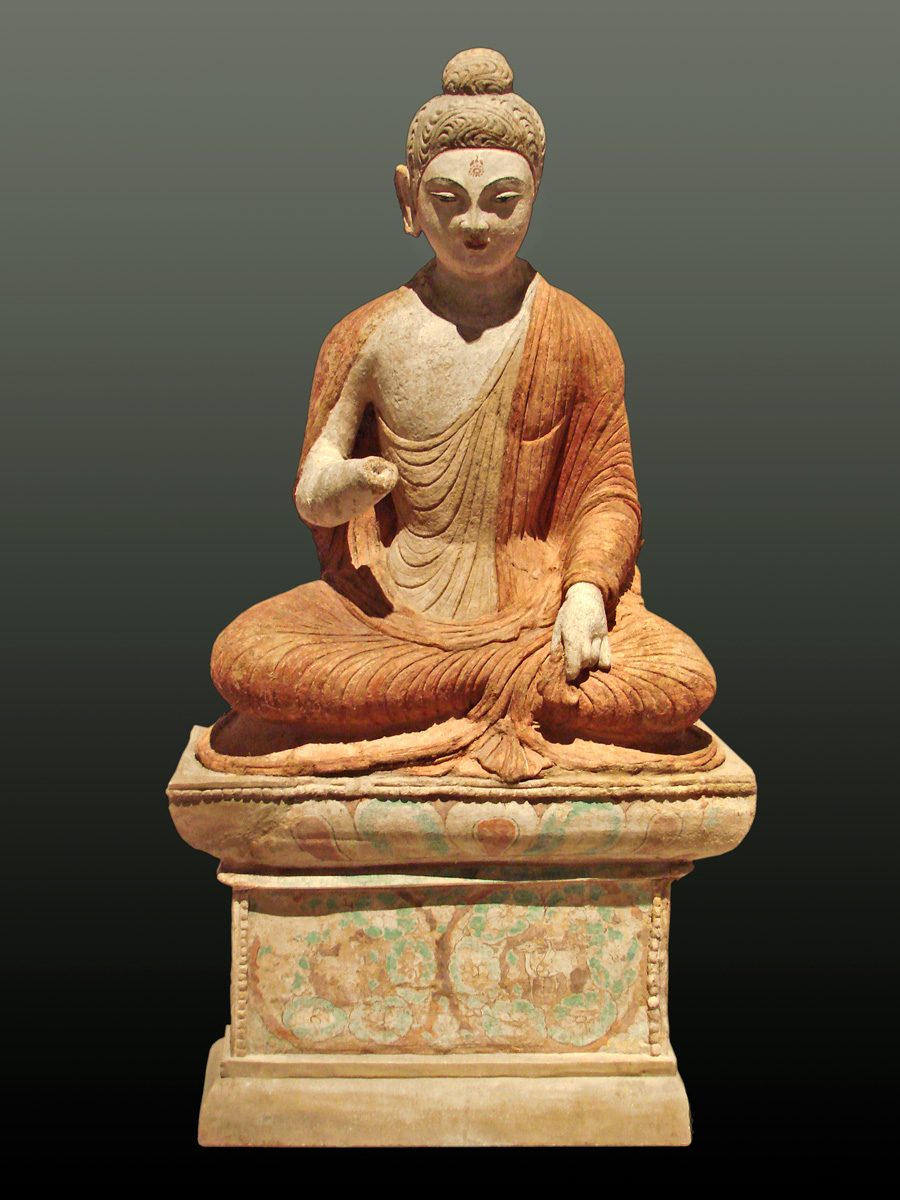
A Buddha statue from Shorchuk.

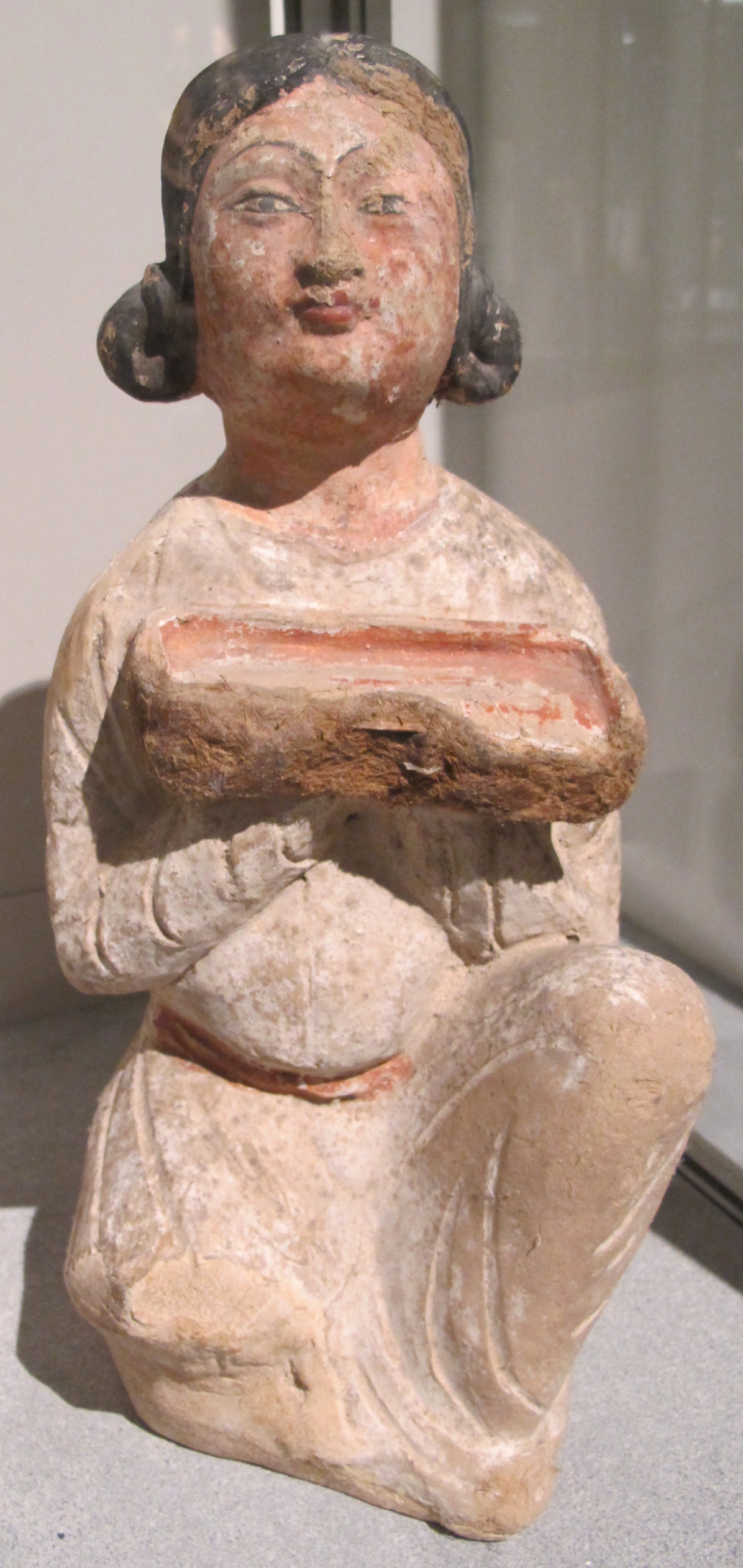
Tang figurine from Kucha.

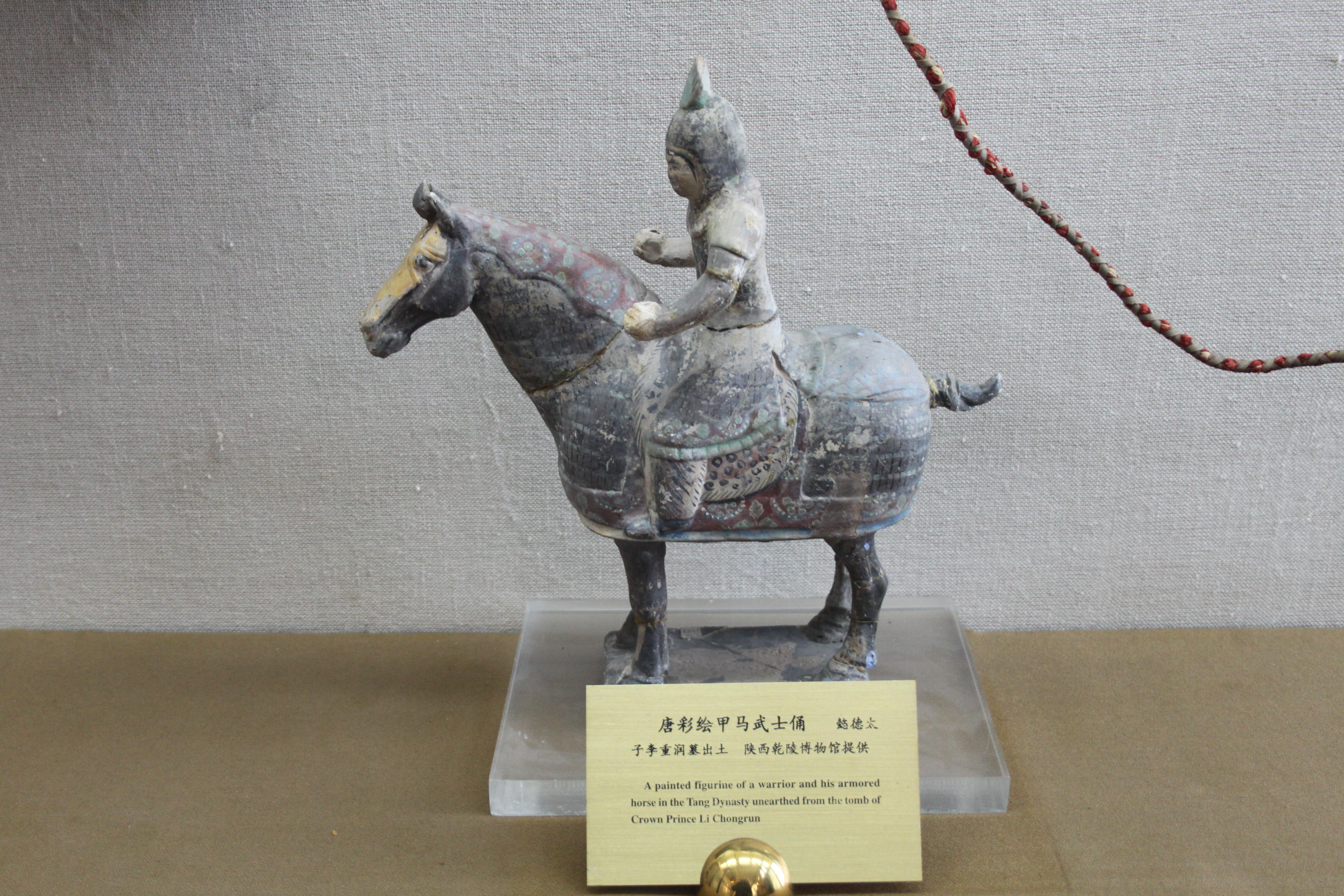
Tang armored horse rider.

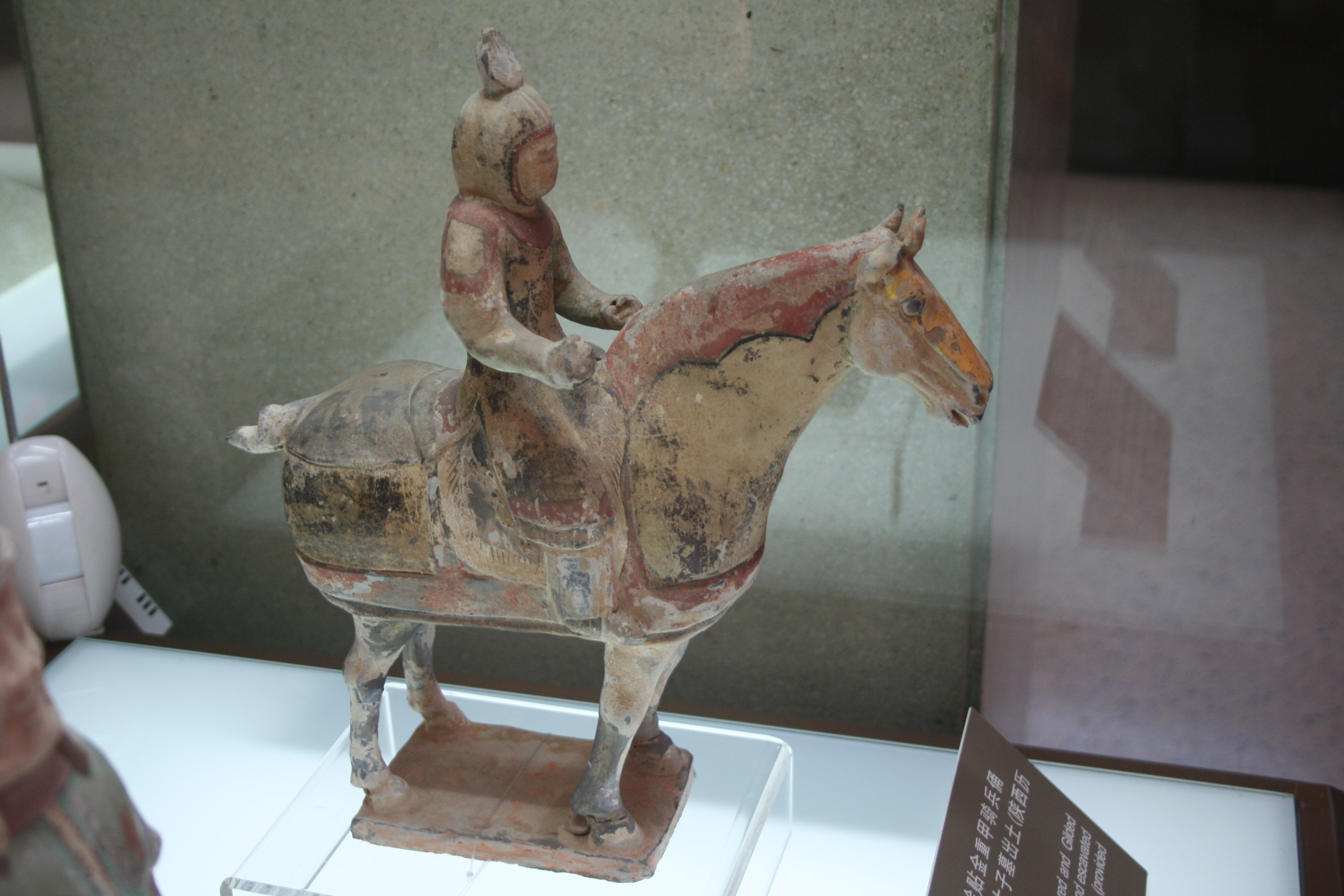
Tang pottery cavalry.

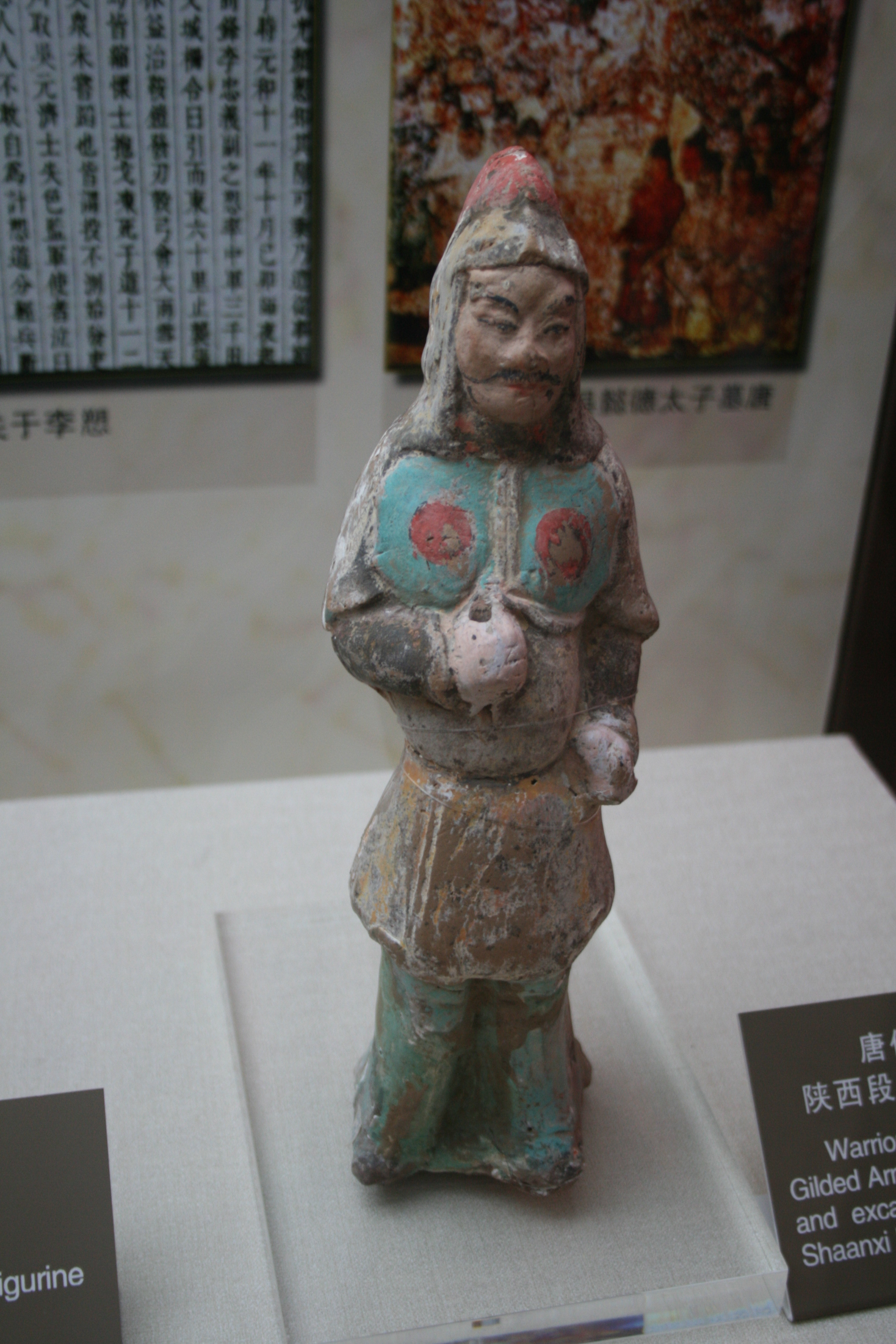
Tang pottery soldier.

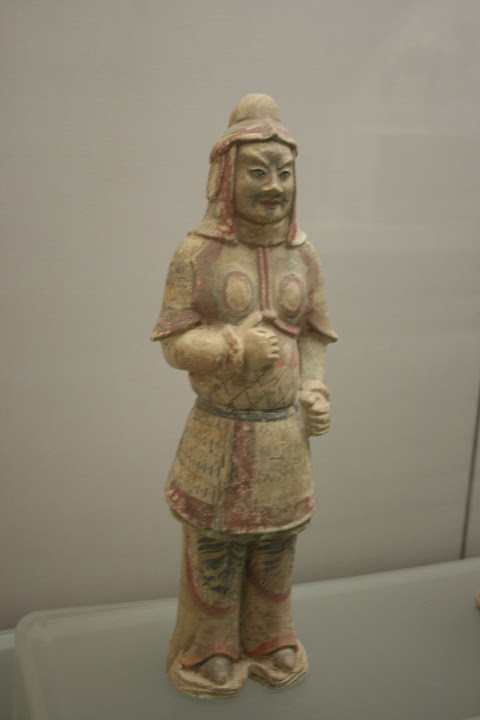
Tang pottery soldier.

== See also ==
- Shule Kingdom, Kingdom of Khotan, Kingdom of Qocho, Shanshan
- Protectorate General to Pacify the North
- Protectorate General to Pacify the East
- Protectorate General to Pacify the South
- Chinese Turkestan
- Chinese military history
- Horses in East Asian warfare
- Tang–Tibet relations
- Tang dynasty in Inner Asia
- Four Garrisons of Anxi
- Protectorate of the Western Regions
- Xinjiang under Qing rule
- Administrative divisions of the Tang dynasty
- Beiting Protectorate
