= Li Siye =

Li Siye (Chinese: 李嗣業; died March 2, 759), posthumous name Prince Zhongyong of Wuwei (武威忠勇王), was a general of the Tang dynasty. He was known to have fought at the Battle of Talas after the defeat of the primary army commanded by Gao Xianzhi, and his efforts allowed Gao to escape from the pursuit of the Abbasid Caliphate forces. Li Siye later died from battle injuries whilst fighting against rebel forces during the An Lushan Rebellion.

== Background ==
It is not known when Li Siye was born. His family was from Jingzhao (京兆)—i.e., the area around and including the Tang dynasty capital Chang'an. He was said to be over two meters tall. Early in Emperor Xuanzong of Tang's Tianbao era (742–756), he was conscripted and stationed at the Protectorate General to Pacify the West, also known as the Anxi Protectorate, and made his career there. At that time, Tang soldiers had just adopted the use of a heavy sword known as the "Mo sword" (陌刀), possibly a variation of the Changdao, and it was said that Li Siye was particularly skillful in its employment. He often served as a forward commander and was usually successful in battle. The jiedushi of Anxi, Fumeng Lingcha (夫蒙靈詧), recognized his abilities and often had him serve in military campaigns. He was eventually promoted to a commanding officer with the rank of Zhonglangjiang (中郎將).

In 748, when Gao Xianzhi, then the deputy military governor of Anxi, led an army against Lesser Bolü (小勃律, a city state centering modern Gilgit, Pakistan), then a vassal of the Tibetan Empire, Gao selected Li Siye and Tian Zhen (田珍) to serve as his deputies. The Tibetan army was then stationed at Suole (娑勒), near Lesser Bolü's capital. At Gao's direction, Li Siye and Tian launched a surprise attack on Suole by leading their soldiers through a path that involved climbing a cliff. They caught the Tibetan army by surprise and defeated them. They then advanced on Lesser Bolü's capital and captured its king and queen (a Tibetan princess). As a result of the battle, 72 city states in the region submitted to Tang. For his contribution, Li Siye was made a general.

== During the Battle of Talas ==
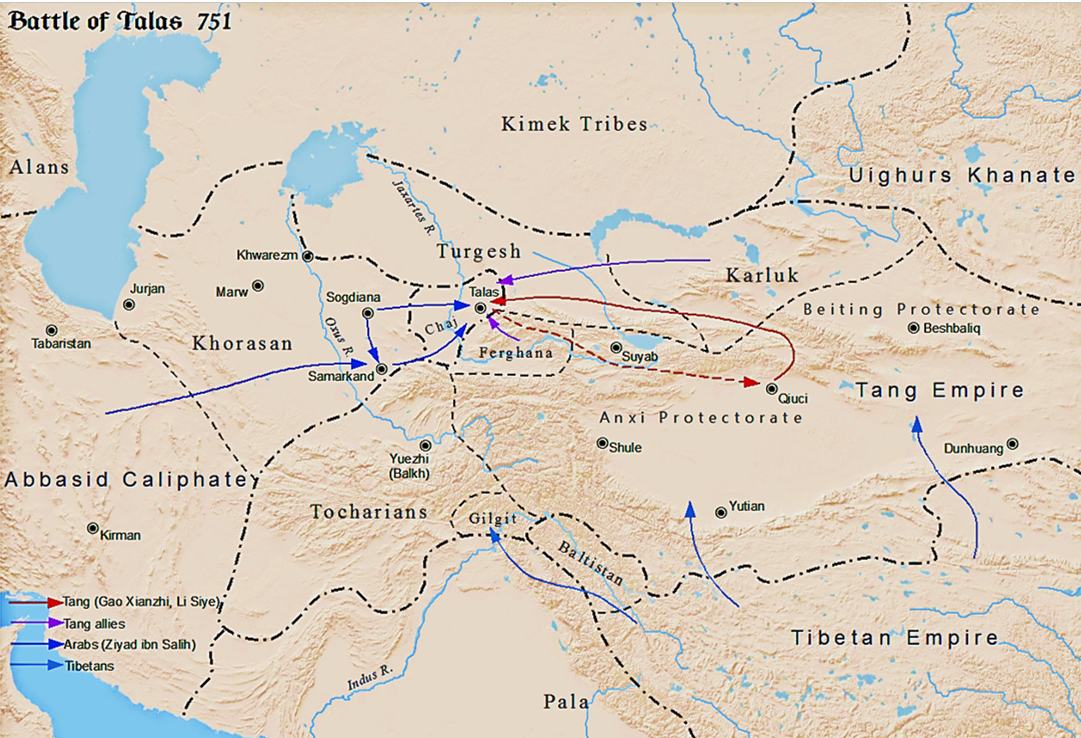
Battle of Talas

In 751, Li Siye followed Gao Xianzhi in a campaign west against the Abbasid Caliphate that climaxed in the Battle of Talas. The Tang and Abbasid forces were locked in battle for several days, before the Karluks turned against Gao, causing Gao's forces to collapse. Only a few thousand survived. Gao tried to regather the scattered army, but Li Siye pointed out that continued battle would mean annihilation of the remaining troops, urging Gao to retreat. Gao agreed. Li Siye served as the rearguard and was able to successfully keep the path of flight open—as Gao's allied Ferghana (拔汗那) forces crowded the narrow escape path, Li Siye battered their soldiers and livestock with a staff, killing many—and fight off Abbasid pursuers. For this valiant effort, he was promoted in his general rank under Gao's recommendation. However, Duan Xiushi, also serving under Gao, rebuked Li Siye for advocating what effectively meant the abandonment of any straggling soldiers. Li Siye, impressed with Duan's fortitude, made Duan his own assistant upon return to Anxi.

== An Lushan Rebellion ==
In 755, the general An Lushan rebelled against Tang, and by 756, the forces of his Yan dynasty were approaching the Tang capital Chang'an, forcing Xuanzong to flee to Jiannan Circuit (劍南, headquartered in modern Chengdu, Sichuan). Xuanzong's son and crown prince Li Heng fled to Lingwu and was declared emperor there. Emperor Suzong summoned forces from various border outposts, including from Anxi. Li Siye was then the deputy military governor of Anxi, and he initially suggested to the jiedushi Liang Zai (梁宰) that they wait for more information. Duan Xiushi, however, rebuked him, pointing out that Suzong's position was desperate. Li Siye changed his mind and agreed with Duan, and Liang subsequently commissioned Li Siye to lead the Anxi forces to rendezvous with Emperor Suzong at Fengxiang (鳳翔, in modern Baoji, Shaanxi), with Duan as his deputy. On the way, under LI Siye's orders, the army followed strict discipline and did not cause damage to the people. When LI Siye's army arrived at Fengxiang, Suzong was very pleased, and had LI Siye serve as a commander of the imperial forces, along with Guo Ziyi and Pugu Huai'en. At this time, it was said that Li Siye's weapon of choice was still his staff, and that he would lead his forces into battle, charging while swinging his staff, and was without rival. He was made the commander of the expedition forces from Anxi and Beiting (北庭, headquartered in modern Changji Hui Autonomous Prefecture, Xinjiang).

In fall 757, with joint forces of Tang, under overall command by Suzong's son Li Chu the Prince of Guangping, and Tang's allied Uyghurs, poised to attack Chang'an to recapture it from Yan forces. When the forces met and engaged near Xiangji Temple west of Chang'an, the Tang forces initially suffered losses and the morale was about to collapse. Seeing the situation, Li Siye stripped off his upper armor and rode topless on his warhorse, battering fleeing soldiers with his staff to prevent a rout. With the panic under control, Li then spearheaded a Tang counterattack and defeated the Yan forces, killing 60,000 and capturing 20,000 on the field. This victory forced Yan forces to abandon Chang'an, allowing Tang to recapture the capital. Li also contributed to capturing Luoyang from An Lushan's son An Qingxu (who had assassinated An Lushan earlier in 757 and become the emperor of Yan). For Li Siye contributions, he was made the minister of army supplies (衛尉卿, Weiwei Qing) and created the Duke of Guo. He was also given the rank of jiedushi.

An Qingxu withdrew to Yecheng and took up defensive position there. Tang forces converged on Yecheng and put it under siege, but with the Tang forces under 10 different jiedushi, the attack was disorganized. Li Siye was often a leader in the assaults on Yecheng. In spring 759, during one of the attacks on Yecheng's defenses, he was hit by a stray arrow. He rested in the camp, and for some time it appeared that his wound would heal. However, when Tang forces launched a subsequent attack, when Li Siye heard the war drums being played, he yelled out in a loud voice, and suddenly, he bled profusely from his wound and died. When the news reached Emperor Suzong, he was shocked, and issued an edict praising Li Siye. He posthumously created Li Siye the Prince of Wuwei and allowed Li Siye's son Li Zuoguo (李佐國) to inherit the title.

== Notes and references ==
- Old Book of Tang, vol. 109.
- New Book of Tang, vol. 138.
- Zizhi Tongjian, vols. 215, 216, 218, 220, 221.
