= Feng Changqing =

Chinese general of the Tang dynasty (d. 756)

Feng Changqing (Chinese: 封常清; pinyin: Fēng Chángqīng; Wade–Giles: Feng Ch'ang-ch'ing (died January 24, 756) was a Chinese general of the Tang dynasty. Feng was described as ugly in his appearance, and when he first met Gao Xianzhi and asked to be a guard for Gao, Gao initially rejected him, but eventually agreed to take Feng as a soldier under his command. He distinguished himself under the commands of Gao and Wang Zhengjian (王正見), particularly in a battle against Greater Bolü (大勃律, near modern Gilgit-Baltistan, Pakistan) in 753, eventually commissioned as a military governor (jiedushi). After failing to defeat An Lushan's rebellion in 755, however, both he and Gao were executed due to accusations against them made by the eunuch Bian Lingcheng (邊令誠).

== Background ==
Feng Changqing's family was from Yishi (猗氏, in modern Yuncheng, Shanxi). His maternal grandfather had committed a crime and was exiled to Shymkent, to serve in the Tang dynasty army, as part of the army for Anxi Circuit (安西, headquartered in modern Aksu Prefecture, Xinjiang) with the responsibility to guard the south gate of the non-Han portion of the city. Feng's grandfather was learned, and often sat with Feng on the gate tower to teach him, giving Feng a broad education. After his grandfather died, Feng was in his 30s, but was poor and alone. At that time, Fumeng Lingcha (夫蒙靈詧) was the military governor (jiedushi) of Anxi, and one of the generals serving under Fumeng was Gao Xianzhi. Gao was considered capable, and retained a corps of 30 guards with handsome clothes. Feng submitted a petition to Gao, asking to be one of the guards, but as Feng was thin, ugly, and walking with a limp with short legs, Gao rejected him. He submitted another petition the next day, and Gao responded, "I already have enough guards. Why come again?" Feng angrily responded:

I, Feng Changqing, had admired you for your righteousness and therefore was willing to serve you earnestly. Therefore, I come to you despite the lack of anyone to speak on my behalf. Why do you reject me thus? If you judge people based on ability and actions, that is expected of you as an official. If you judge people on looks, you will lose out on Ziyu.

Gao still did not accept him. Feng stayed outside Gao's house door waiting for Gao to enter and leave, for tens of days. Eventually, Gao could not stand it and added him to the guard corps.

== Army service in the Xiyu region ==
At one point, near the end of Emperor Xuanzong's Kaiyuan era (727-741), when Gao Xianzhi had been promoted to be Fumeng Lingcha's deputy, Fumeng had put Gao in charge of attacking the rebellious Daxi (達奚) tribe. Gao was successful in the attack, and was able to kill or capture nearly all of the rebels. Without having been directed by Gao to do so, Feng drafted a report of the victory on Gao's behalf, clearly stating the geographical features, the strategies used, and details of the victory. He presented it to Gao, who was surprised as how well-written it was and how it had anticipated everything Gao wanted to say. Gao submitted the report written by Feng to Fumeng, unsealed and written on a large banner, to allow the tribes on the way to see the victory. After Gao returned to Anxi headquarters, Fumeng held a feast in his honor, and Fumeng's assistants Liu Tiao (劉眺) and Dugu Jun (獨孤峻) both anxiously asked Gao, "Who was it who wrote the report? How did you, Lord, retain such an impressive person?" Gao responded, "It was my guard Feng Changqing." Liu and Dugu were surprised, and they invited Feng to join the feast as well. Feng thereafter became known to the Anxi headquarter staff, and was given the honorific title of castle defender and made Gao's assistant. He was thereafter several times promoted in rank.

In 747, Feng served under Gao in the conquest of Lesser Bolü (小勃律, a city state centering on modern Gilgit, Pakistan). Around the new year 748, after Gao was promoted to be the military governor of Anxi, replacing Fumeng, Feng, at Gao's recommendation, received an honorary commission on the staff of Emperor Xuanzong's oldest son Li Cong the Prince of Qing, but remained at Anxi and served as Gao's assistant, with the position only below the deputy military governor. He often was put in charge of the headquarters when Gao was out conducting campaigns. Gao entrusted his household matters, however, to Zheng Dequan (鄭德詮), the son of Gao's wet nurse, whom Gao treated as a brother and therefore was powerful in the army. On one occasion, because of this, Zheng did not, as was proper under military protocol, salute Feng as a superior officer. Feng ordered Zheng to report to headquarters, and then locked the doors and stated to him:

I, Feng Changqing, came from a humble station, and surely you know that I had to repeatedly ask to serve as a guard of the Zhongcheng even though he repeatedly rejected me. But now the Zhongcheng is away, and he entrusted headquarters matters to me as acting military governor. How can you be so rude to your superior?

He then yelled out, "You, general, must temporarily die to affirm good order in the army." He thus caned Zheng 60 times, and Zheng died. Gao's wife and wet nurse cried bitterly outside but could not get in to save Zheng. They submitted an accusation to Gao, but all Gao said upon reading the accusation was, "Alas, he died?" When he and Feng met again, neither of them spoke of the matter, as Gao was impressed with Feng's discipline. In addition, when two other generals committed crimes, Feng also killed them, thus reaffirming military discipline.

In 751, Gao was initially set to be made the military governor of Hexi Circuit (河西, headquartered in modern Wuwei, Gansu), and he asked that Feng be made his assistant. (Subsequently, though, due to machinations of An Sishun, then military governor of Hexi, who wanted to remain there, Gao was instead recalled to the capital to serve as a general of the imperial guards.) When Wang Zhengjian was named as the military governor of Anxi to replace Gao, he asked Feng to serve as his deputy. When Wang died in 752, Feng was made acting military governor. In 753, he attacked Greater Bolü and forced its submission to Tang. In 754, when he went to Chang'an to meet Emperor Xuanzong, he was given a number of honors and a mansion in Chang'an, and his deceased parents also received posthumous honors; soon thereafter, he was officially made military governor. It was said that Feng was hard-working and frugal, and sometimes rode a mule while commanding the army. He was strict in discipline and awards.

== Death ==
In 755, An Lushan, the military governor of Fanyang Circuit (范陽, headquartered in modern Beijing), launched a rebellion against Emperor Xuanzong's rule. Late that year, Feng Changqing arrived in Chang'an to meet with Emperor Xuanzong. When they met on December 23, Emperor Xuanzong asked him what should be done. Feng, initially believing that An's rebellion could be quelled quickly, volunteered to head to the eastern capital Luoyang to defend it and then to counterattack. Emperor Xuanzong agreed, and commissioned Feng as the military governor of Fanyang and Pinglu (平盧, headquartered in modern Chaoyang, Liaoning) to replace An. That day, Feng headed to Luoyang to gather troops and prepare for defenses. Once he got there, he gathered 60,000 men and destroyed the Yellow River bridge to prepare for attack, but quickly found out that he had a major problem—there were insufficient weapons available for his troops. Meanwhile, An crossed the Yellow River elsewhere and captured Chenliu (陳留, roughly modern Kaifeng, Henan) and Yingyang (滎陽, roughly modern Zhengzhou, Henan) Commanderies, and then arrived at Luoyang. Feng tried to defend with his inadequately-supplied troops, but could not. An entered the city, and Feng was forced to destroy the western gate in order to get out of Luoyang and retreat west.

Meanwhile, Gao Xianzhi, who was the acting supreme commander of the forces, was stationed at Shan Prefecture (陝郡, roughly modern Sanmenxia, Henan). Feng retreated to Shan, where Emperor Xuanzong sent an order stripping him of titles but allowing him to remain in the army under Gao. Feng warned Gao that Shan Prefecture was difficult to defend—that they should retreat to Tong Pass and fortify its defenses against An's attack. Gao agreed, and they abandoned Shan and withdrew to Tong Pass. When An later arrived, he could not capture it. Meanwhile, though, Feng was detecting signs that he might be in trouble, and anticipatorily wrote a final submission to Emperor Xuanzong, warning him about An's strengths and cautioning against overconfidence, as the other officials at the time generally believed that An could be defeated quickly.

Meanwhile, during the campaign, Gao had caused much offense against the eunuch Bian Lingcheng, serving as his monitor, as Bian was making demands of him that he was not meeting. When Bian returned to Chang'an, he accused Feng of exaggerating An's strength, and accused Gao of improperly abandoning Shan as well as corruptly withholding food supplies and imperial rewards to soldiers for personal benefit. Emperor Xuanzong, believing Bian, issued edicts for Feng's and Gao's executions. After Bian returned to Tong Pass, he first read the edict for Feng's execution. Feng, after giving his submission to Bian to submit to Emperor Xuanzong, was beheaded, and upon the completion of that execution, Bian then read the second edict ordering Gao's execution. Gao cried out:

I retreated when I encountered the bandits [(i.e., An's army)], and I should die for this. But I swear to the heaven above and the earth below -- the accusations that I stole the food supplies and the imperial rewards are false!

The soldiers cried out for Gao as well, but Bian still beheaded Gao. As Gao was to be killed, he looked at Feng's body and stated:

Feng Er [(i.e., the second son from the Feng household, thus implying that Feng was the second son)], you became prominent from your low station. I promoted you to be my assistant, and you later succeeded me as jiedushi. It is fate that we die together here today.
