= Battle of Aksu =

Battle of Aksu may refer to:

- Battle of Aksu (717), a battle of the Muslim conquest of Transoxiana
- Battle of Aksu (1265), a battle between the Golden Horde and the Ilkhanate
- Battle of Aksu (1933), a minor battle of the Kumul Rebellion
