= Ashina Zhen =

- Xingxiwang Qaghan (興昔亡可汗)
- Reign: 735–736
- Predecessor: Ashina Xian
- Successor: None
Names
- Ashina Zhen (阿史那震)
- House: Ashina
- Dynasty: Western Turkic Khaganate
- Father: Ashina Xian

Ashina Zhen (Chinese: 阿史那震), also known as Shi Zhen (史震), was a puppet qaghan of the Western Turkic Khaganate, installed by the Tang dynasty. He was the last ruler to be appointed Xingxiwang Qaghan (興昔亡可汗).

== Life ==
Ashina Zhen was a son of Ashina Xian. In October of 735, Turkic tribe leader and warlord Suluk attacked the Beiting Protectorate. As a reaction, he was appointed as Xingxiwang Khagan to defend the Four Garrisons of Anxi and attached him to Gai Jiayun (蓋嘉運). However, he was removed from this post when he was defeated in 736.

== Source ==
- Cefu Yuangui
