= Battle of Aksu (717) =

Battle between the Umayyad Caliphate and the Tang dynasty

- Part of the Muslim conquest of Transoxiana
Date	August 15, 717 AD
Location	Aksu
Result	Tang-Gokturk-Karluk victory

Belligerents
Tang dynasty Karluks; Western Turks	Umayyad Caliphate; Tibetan Empire; Turgesh allies

Commanders and leaders
Tang Jiahui; Ashina Xin; Ashina Xian; Kül Tigin	Abd Allah b. Ma'mar b. Sameer Al-Yashkuri, (Arab commander); Turgesh Khan Suluk.

The Battle of Aksu (Chinese: 撥換城之戰; Arabic: معركة أقسو) was fought between the Umayyad Caliphate, and their Turgesh and Tibetan allies, against the Tang dynasty, and their Karluk and Western Turk allies. On 15th August, 717 AD, the Umayyads, guided by their Turgesh allies, besieged Aksu (Buat-ɦuɑn) and Uqturpan (Dai-dʑiᴇk-dʑiᴇŋ) in the Aksu region of Xinjiang. Tang troops backed by their protectorates in the region attacked and routed the besieging Umayyads forcing them to retreat.

== Location ==
The battle took place somewhere in the Xinjiang region near modern China's border with Kyrgyzstan.

Location of Aksu and Uqturpan

== Background ==
The first encounter between the Tang Chinese and the Umayyad Arabs had occurred in 715 when Arab general Qutayba ibn Muslim (699-715) invaded the Fergana Valley for the second time, as a continuation of his conquests in Transoxiana: Bukhara in 709, Khwarezm and Samarkand in 712, Shash (Tashkent) in 713 and his first incursion into Ferghana in 714. After his conquest of Khujand, the Tibetan Empire allied with the Arabs. Together they deposed the Ikhshid (king of Ferghana), Baashak, and installed the Ferghanan prince Alutar as King.

The deposed Baashak fled east to the Tang, chased by an Arab raiding party to Kashgar - which the Arabs raided and then turned back. At Kucha, seat of the Anxi Protectorate, Baashak sought Chinese intervention. Meanwhile, the Arab position in Transoxiana was greatly weakened by the failed rebellion and death of Qutayba shortly after.

In December 715, the Chinese sent 10,000 troops under Zhang Xiaosong from Kucha to Ferghana. He defeated the Tibetan-Umayyad occupation force and their client, King Alutar at Namangan and reinstalled Baashak on the throne, now as a Tang Vassal. (Note: Original Chinese source for Ferghana Campaigns: Zizhi Tongjian Volume 227, Chapter 27, Yimao year (715): 枝汗那者，古烏孫也，內附歲久。吐蕃與大食共立阿了達爲王，發兵攻之，枝汗那王兵敗，奔安西求救。孝嵩謂都護呂休璟曰：「不救則無以號令西域。」遂帥旁側戎落兵萬餘人，出龜茲西數千里，下數百城，長驅而進。是月，攻阿了達於連城。孝嵩自擐甲督士卒急攻，自巳至酉，屠其三城，俘斬千餘級，阿了達與數騎逃入山谷。孝嵩傳檄諸國，威振西域，大食、康居、大宛、罽賓等八國皆遣使請降。勒石紀功而還。會有言其贓污者，坐系涼州獄，貶靈州兵曹參軍。 Fergana (Zhihanna) is the ancient land of the Wusun and had long been a tributary subject to the Tang. The Tibetans (Tufan) and the Arabs (Dashi) jointly installed Alada as its king and deployed troops to attack it. The rightful King of Fergana was defeated in battle and fled to Anxi to plead for help. Zhang Xiaosong said to the Protector-General Lyu Xiuqing: "If we do not rescue them, we will lose our authority to command the Western Regions." He then led over 10,000 soldiers from the neighbouring nomadic tribes, marched thousands of li west of Kucha (Qiuci), captured hundreds of walled towns, and drove deep into the territory. That month, they attacked Alada at Liancheng. Zhang Xiaosong personally donned his armor to supervise his troops in a fierce assault. From the hour of Si to You (9:00 AM to 7:00 PM), they slaughtered three of their walled cities, capturing and beheading over a thousand enemy soldiers. Alada, accompanied by only a few horsemen, fled into the mountain valleys. Zhang Xiaosong dispatched official proclamations to the various kingdoms, sending shockwaves of awe across the Western Regions. Eight kingdoms—including the Arabs, Kangju (Sogdiana), Dayuan, and Jibin (Kabul)—all sent envoys to offer their submission. Zhang Xiaosong engraved his achievements onto a stone monument and returned. However, someone subsequently accused him of corruption and bribery. As a result, he was imprisoned in Liangzhou and demoted to the post of Military Administrator of Lingzhou.")In 717, the new Umayyad Caliph, Umar ibn Abd al-Aziz, strengthened the alliance with the Tibetans, sending al-Saleet b. Abd Allah al-Hanafi to explain Islam to them. He also sent an army commanded by Abd Allah b. Ma'mar b. Sameer Al-Yashkuri to Transoxiana, hoping to capture the Tarim Basin from the Tang dynasty's Four Garrisons of Anxi. The invading Umayyad forces captured several forts in Ferghana and had taken control of all of Ferghana. The Umayyads then captured Kashgar and proceeded on towards Aksu.

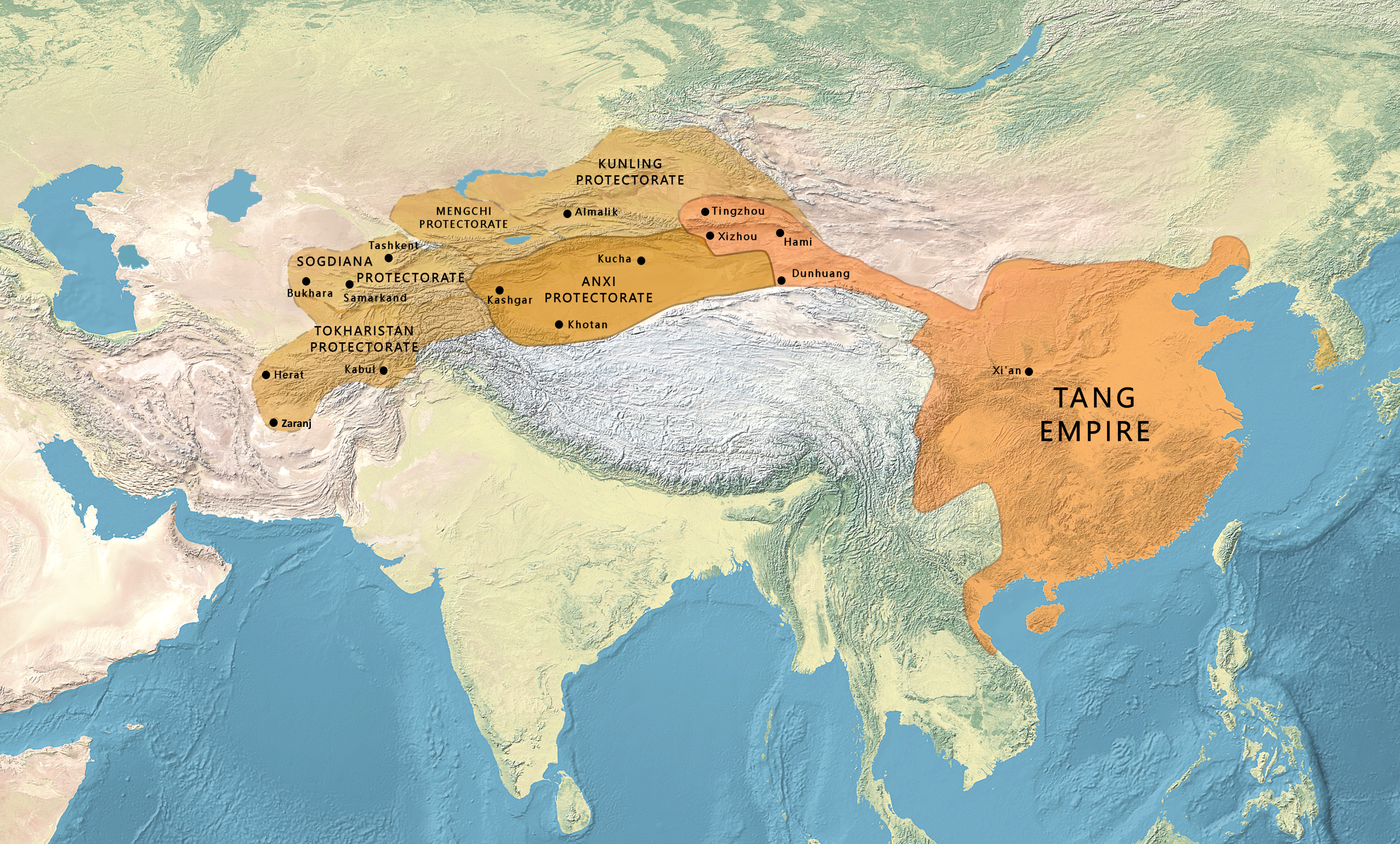
The Anxi Protectorate in relation to the wider Tang empire; and Tang attempted protectorates in Central Asia

== Battle ==
On or around the date of 15th August, 717, the Umayyads along with their Turgesh and Tibetan allies besieged Aksu and Uqturpan County (85km to the northwest of Aksu) which were under Chinese protection. The commander of China's four Anxi garrisons in Central Asia, Tang Jiahui, sent two armies: one composed of Tang professionally-trained troops consisting of a mix of crossbowmen and spearmen led by Jiahui himself and the other composed of Karluk horsemen led by Ashina Xian. (Note: Original Chinese source for this battle: Zizhi Tongjian Volume 227, Chapter 27, Ding Si year (717): 安西副大都護湯嘉惠奏突騎施引大食、吐蕃，謀取四鎭，圍缽換及大石城，已發三姓葛邏祿兵與阿史那獻擊之。 Tang Jiahui, the Deputy Grand Protector-General of Anxi, reported in a memorial to the throne: "The Turgesh (Tuqishi) have guided the Arabs and Tibetans in a conspiracy to seize the Four Garrisons. They are currently besieging Aksu (Bohuan) and Uqturpan. I have already dispatched troops from the Three-Tribes Karluks (Geluolu), alongside Ashina Xian, to counter-attack them.")

In the resulting battle, the Umayyad army was heavily defeated and forced to retreat. Al-Yashkuri fled back to Shash, while many Umayyad troops were taken prisoner but were subsequently released after the Caliphate paid a ransom in gold.

At the same time, another Tibetan army was defeated around eastern Qinghai by Tang general Guo Zhiyun, military governor of Longyou circuit (greater Gansu). Ending the coordinated Arab-Tibetan attempt to conquer the Tarim Basin.

== Aftermath ==
As a result of the battle, the Umayyads were expelled from Northern Transoxiana. The Turgesh submitted to the Tang and subsequently attacked the Umayyads in Ferghana. With Chinese backing, the Turgesh launched punitive attacks into Umayyad territory eventually wresting all of Ferghana from the Umayyads with the exception of a few forts. For their loyalty, the Tang emperor conferred imperial titles on the Turgesh khagan Suluk and awarded him the city of Suyab.

On a wider scale, the position of the Arabs throughout all Transoxiana was weakened, with Samarkand and Bukhara sending missions to the Tang seeking help against the Arabs. Even the Yabghu of Tokharistan, and principalities of Afghanistan sent embassies to Chang'an. It took several decades for the Arabs to recover their former position, defeating the Turgesh in 737 at the battle of Battle of Kharistan.

Despite Arab-Chinese hostility in this battle, the Tang allied with the Umayyads against the Turgesh in 735, planning a joint attack on the Turgesh capital of Suyab. However, the Tang defeated them without need of Arab help at Beshbalik in early 736, despite this they still wanted to take Suyab with the Arabs, but eventually agreed to Turgesh surrender in September; so the planned joint operation never occurred. (Note: Chinese source from "The Collected Works of Minister Zhang of Qujiang, Chancellor of the Tang Dynasty" (唐丞相曲江张先生文集) Volume 8:河西节度使牛仙客戎狄无义禽兽不若但当以兵威取此岂可人道论之突𮪍施顷者通和朕每抚之如子行李来徃不隔𡻕时赐与优饶非直君长而窥我邉𨻶图䧟庭川阙侯斤所以见诛天下孰云不当不思巳过仍敢我讐率其犬羊犯我城堡是其送死之日可谓天亡之时若不因其自来乗危决䇿一失此便后悔何追宜密令安西徴蕃汉兵一万人仍使人星夜倍道与大食计会取叶护㪍逹等路入碎叶令王斛斯自领精𮪍取其家口河西节度内发蕃汉二万人取𤓰州北高同伯帐路西入仍委卿简择骁将统率仍先与西庭等计会尅日齐入此已勑朔方军西受降城定逺城及灵州兼取大家子弟并丰安新泉等军共徴二万于𤓰州北庭招托就中简择骁健五千人先入直赴北庭从𤓰州宜给一月熟粮若至北庭粮贮可支五年巳上凡此诸道徴发并限十二月上旬齐集西庭等州一时讨袭时不可失兵贵从权破虏灭胡必在此举卿可火急支计无失便宜今故使内侍程元宗催遣兵马一一口具秋气渐冷卿及将士百姓巳下并平安好遣书指不多及 You shall secretly order the Military Governor of the Anxi protectorate to draft 10,000 foreign and Chinese troops; then dispatch messengers to travel day and night at double speed to coordinate with the Arabs to plan with them to take the Yabghu road and Bedel pass roads to enter Suyab. Order Wang Huxi to personally lead elite cavalry to capture the enemy's families and dependents. As well as Volume 10: 勑王斛斯得卿表并大食东靣将军呼逻散诃宻表具知卿使张舒耀计会兵马廻此虽逺蕃亦是强国观其意理似存信义若四月出兵是实卿彼巳合知之还湏量宜与其相应使知此者计会不是空言且突𮪍施负恩为天所弃诃宻若䏻助国破此冦讐録其逺劳即合优赏但未知事实不可虚行卿可观察蕃情颇有定否即湏随事慰接令彼知之若舒耀等虚有报章未得要领岂徒不实当有所惩絶域行人不容易也今秋此贼形候如何善湏防之勿使侵轶时暑卿及将士巳下并平安好遣书指不多及 We have received your memorial, alongside the secret report from Hu-luo-san Khami (Khorasan), the General of the Eastern Front of Dashi (the Arabs). We fully understand that the troops and horses you dispatched via Zhang Shuyao have returned from their coordination mission. Although Dashi is a distant foreign land, it is a powerful nation. Judging by the tone and reasoning of their message, they seem to possess sincerity and righteousness. If it is true that they will deploy their troops in the fourth month, your forces over there should already be aware of it.You must respond to them accordingly based on the circumstances, letting them know that our coordination is not empty talk. Furthermore, the Turgesh have turned their backs on Our kindness and have been abandoned by Heaven. If Khami (Khorasan) can assist our empire in destroying these enemy rebels, We shall record their long-distance toil and grant them exceptional rewards. However, since the exact facts are not yet fully verified, We cannot act blindly. You must observe the sentiments of the barbarians to see if there is any definitive certainty, and comfort/receive them accordingly as events unfold, ensuring they are kept informed.) Even 5 years later in 741, the Tang still prioritized the Sino-Arab alliance, refusing to support its own vassal, the king of Tashkent, against the invading Umayyads.
