= Site Museum of Bashbaliq City, Silk Road =

Coordinates: 44.0654°N 89.2033°E

- 丝绸之路北庭故城遗址博物馆
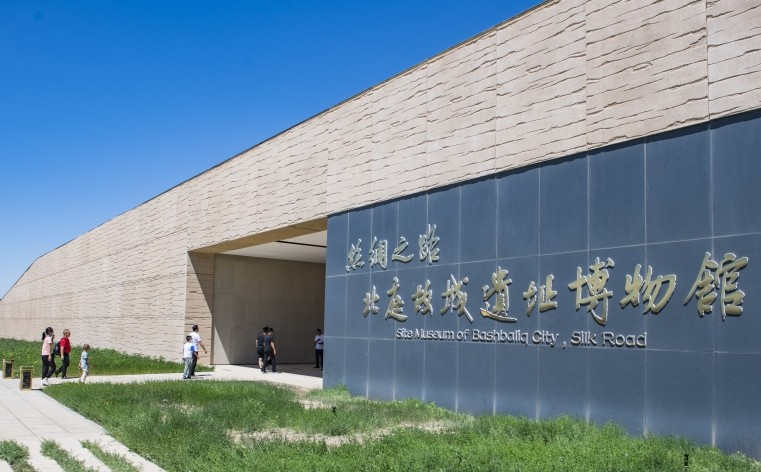
- Established: 14 July 2022
- Location: Jimsar County, Changji Hui Autonomous Prefecture, Xinjiang, China
- Type: Archaeology / Cultural Heritage Museum

The Site Museum of Bashbaliq City, Silk Road, was inaugurated on 14 July 2022, with Beiting Ancient City—inscribed on the UNESCO World Heritage “Silk Roads: Chang’an–Tianshan Corridor” list—as its focal point.

== Location and architecture ==
The museum is situated approximately 180 m southwest of the intersection of X208 and Houbaozi Road in Jimsar County. Architecturally, the facility comprises four thematic exhibition halls—Silk Road Legends, Governance of the Western Regions, Cultural Beiting, and Beiting Reborn—arranged around a central lobby and designed to echo the concentric layout of the ancient city its collections interpret.

== Collections ==
The museum houses over 530 excavated artifacts spanning from the Han to Yuan dynasties, including ceramic ritual vessels, chicken‑head spouted ewers, and glazed roof tiles. In 2025, the on‑site conservation studio completed the restoration of 110 artifacts—including pottery, coins, bone implements, and architectural fittings—to facilitate both display and research.

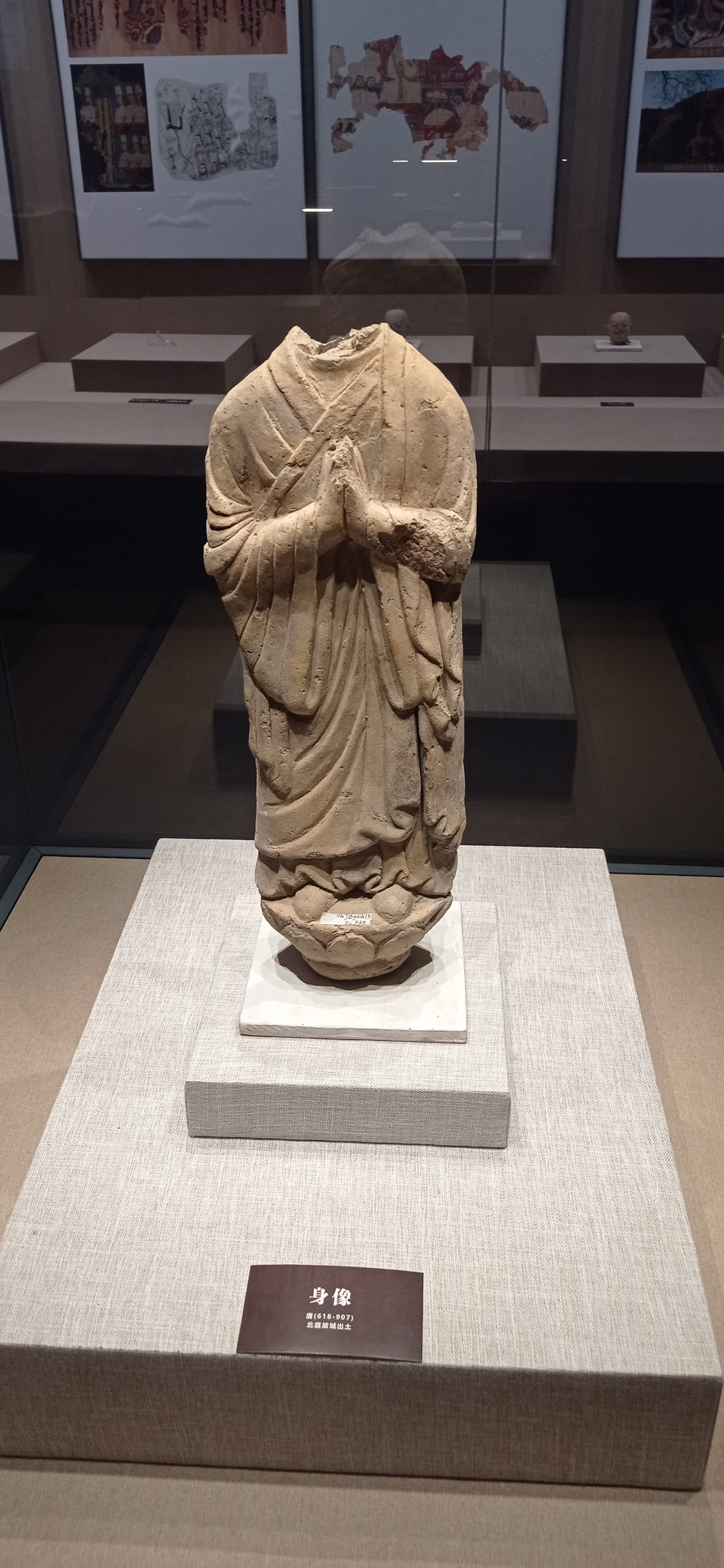
Statue of a monk (Tang dynasty)
