= Protectorate (imperial China) =

Frontier territorial division in imperial China

- Traditional Chinese: 都護府
- Simplified Chinese: 都护府
- Literal meaning: governor's prefecture
Transcriptions
Standard Mandarin
- Hanyu Pinyin: dūhù fǔ
Middle Chinese
- Middle Chinese: /tuo ɦuo^{H} pɨo^{X}/

Protectorate, also known as Duhu Fu (Chinese: 都護府), was a type of administrative division of the Chinese Empire, especially during the Han and Tang dynasties, established in frontier regions. During the Han and Tang dynasties, a protectorate was the highest government agency in frontier areas and was directly responsible to the imperial court. The protectorate governor was called duhu (literally "(capital) city protector"), who needed to take charge in military operations when necessary, and provide instructions to minority tribes and small dependent states within the region. This is different from the Jiedushi (military commissioner) position. During rebellion and wartime, the two position can be held by the same person.

Sometimes, a protectorate had subdivisions named commanderies, or Dudu Fu (Chinese: 都督府). The first protectorate was the Protectorate of the Western Regions established in 60 BCE during Emperor Xuan's reign. It controlled the majority of Tarim Basin and some other parts of Central Asia after the Han dynasty defeated Xiongnu.

== Notable protectorates ==
Notable protectorates in Chinese history include:

- Han dynasty:
  - Protectorate of the Western Regions
- Tang dynasty:
  - Anxi Protectorate
  - Anbei Protectorate
  - Andong Protectorate
  - Annan Protectorate
  - Beiting Protectorate
  - Chanyu Protectorate
- Song dynasty:
  - Longyou Protectorate
- Yuan dynasty:
  - Goryeo (1270–1356)
    - Dongnyeong Prefectures
    - Ssangseong Prefectures
    - Tamna Prefectures

== See also ==
- Commandery (China)
