= Jimsar County =

Jimsar County 吉木萨尔县 (Chinese) جىمىسار ناھىيىسى (Uyghur) Jimasa; Fuyuan
- County
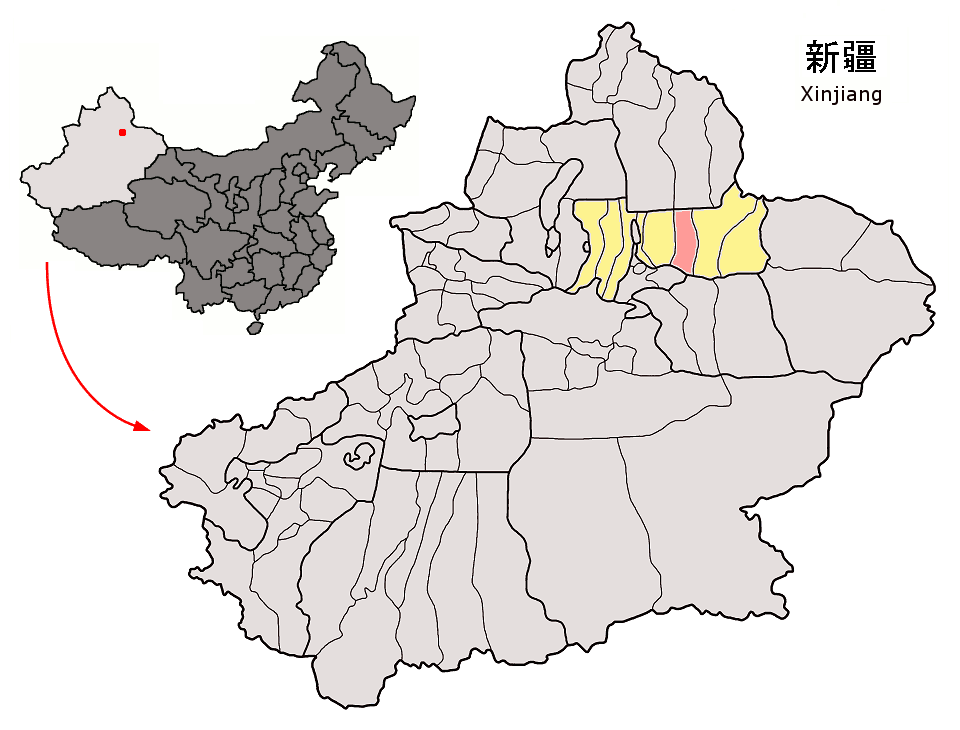
- Location of Jimsar County (pink) in Changji Prefecture (yellow) and Xinjiang (light grey)

- Location within Dzungaria Location within Xinjiang Location within China
- Coordinates: 43°59′N 89°04′E
- Country: China
- Autonomous region: Xinjiang
- Autonomous prefecture: Changji
- Township-level divisions: 4 towns 4 townships
- County seat: Jimsar Town

Area
  - Total: 8,140.84 km^{2} (3,143.20 sq mi)

Population (2020)
  - Total: 153,197
  - Density: 18.8183/km^{2} (48.7392/sq mi)
- Time zone: UTC+8 (China Standard (Note: Locals in Xinjiang frequently observe UTC+6 (Xinjiang Time), 2 hours behind Beijing.))
- Website: www.jmser.gov.cn

Jimsar County

Chinese name
- Simplified Chinese: 吉木萨尔县
- Traditional Chinese: 吉木薩爾縣
Transcriptions
Standard Mandarin
- Hanyu Pinyin: Jímùsà'ěr Xiàn
other Mandarin
- Xiao'erjing: ݣِ‌مُ‌سَاعَر ثِیًا

Alternative Chinese name
- Simplified Chinese: 孚远县
- Traditional Chinese: 孚遠縣
Transcriptions
Standard Mandarin
- Hanyu Pinyin: Fúyuǎn Xiàn

Uyghur name
- Uyghur: جىمىسار ناھىيىسى
Transcriptions
- Latin Yëziqi: Jimisar nahiyisi
- Yengi Yeziⱪ: Jimisar naⱨiyisi
- SASM/GNC: Jimisar nahiyisi
- Siril Yëziqi: Җимисар наһийиси

Jimsar County is a county in Changji Hui Autonomous Prefecture, Xinjiang, China. It contains an area of 8,149 km^{2} (3,146 sq mi). According to the 2002 census, it has a population of 130,000.

Near the town of Jimsar are the ruins of the ancient city of Beiting (Chinese: 北庭; pinyin: Běitíng) or Ting Prefecture (Chinese: 庭州; pinyin: Tíngzhōu), the headquarters of the Beiting Protectorate during the 8th century. It was later known as Beshbalik (Chinese: 别失八里) and became one of the capitals of the Uyghur Khaganate and then the Kingdom of Qocho.

== History ==
The name Beshbalik first appears in history in the description of the events of 713 in the Turkic Kul Tigin inscription. It was one of the largest of five towns in the Uyghur Khaganate. The Tibetans briefly held the city in 790. Established in 1902 as a county, it was known as Fuyuan (孚远) until 1952, when its name was changed to Jimsar.

The modern city Jimsar is located at 43°59'N, 89°4'East; It is a location of the Uyghur ancient southern capital Beshbalik or Beshbalyq. "Balıq" means city in Old Turkic language, so the meaning of Beshbalik/Beshbalyq is "Five cities". This city name appeared in Yuan dynasty record as both 五城(Wǔ Chéng, means 5 cities) or 别失八里(bié shī bā lǐ). It became the Uyghur main capital after a disastrous results of the Yenisei Kirghiz attack on the Uyghur northern capital Karabalgasun (Khanbalyk).

After the attack, a significant part of the Uyghur Khaganate population fled to the area of the present Jimsar County and Tarim Basin in general in 840, where they founded the Kingdom of Qocho. The Uyghurs submitted to Genghis Khan in 1207. Beshbalik consisted of five parts: an outer town, the northern gate of the outer town, the extended town of the west, the inner town and a small settlement within the inner town. At first, the city was the political center of the Uyghur Idiquit (monarch) and his Mongol queen, Altalun, daughter of Genghis Khan under the Mongol Empire in the first half of the 13th century. Alans were recruited into the Mongol forces with one unit called "Right Alan Guard" which was combined with "recently surrendered" soldiers, Mongols, and Chinese soldiers stationed in the area of the former Kingdom of Qocho and in Besh Balikh the Mongols established a Chinese military colony led by Chinese general Qi Kongzhi (Ch'i Kung-chih). Due to military struggles between the Chagatai Khanate and the Yuan dynasty during the reign of Kublai Khan, the city was abandoned and lost its prosperity in the late 13th century. The History of Yuan records the name as both Wu-ch'eng 五城 (5 cities) and Bie-shi-ba-li 别失八里.

Jimsar city was established in the south of the ruins of Beshbalik.

== Subdivisions ==
Jimsar County is made up of 6 towns and 3 townships.

| Name | Simplified Chinese | Hanyu Pinyin | Uyghur (UEY) | Uyghur Latin (ULY) | Administrative division code |
|---|---|---|---|---|---|
Towns
| Jimsar Town | 吉木萨尔镇 | Jímùsà'ěr Zhèn | جىمسار بازىرى | jimsar baziri | 652327100 |
| Santai Town | 三台镇 | Sāntái Zhèn | سەنتەي بازىرى | sentey baziri | 652327101 |
| Quanzijie Town | 泉子街镇 | Quánzǐjiē Zhèn | چۈەنزىگەي بازىرى | chüenzigey baziri | 652327102 |
| Beiting Town | 北庭镇 | Běitíng Zhèn | بېيتىڭ بازىرى | bëyting baziri | 652327103 |
| Ergong Town | 二工镇 | Èrgōng Zhèn | ئەرگۇڭ بازىرى | Ergung baziri | 652327104 |
| Dayou Town | 大有镇 | Dàyǒu Zhèn | دايۇ بازىرى | dayu baziri | 652327105 |
Townships
| Qingyanghu Township | 庆阳湖乡 | Qìngyánghú Xiāng | چىڭياڭخۇ يېزىسى | chingyangxu yëzisi | 652327202 |
| Laotai Township | 老台乡 | Lǎotái Xiāng | لاۋتەي يېزىسى | lawtey yëzisi | 652327203 |
| Xindi Township | 新地乡 | Xīndì Xiāng | شىندى يېزىسى | shindi yëzisi | 652327205 |

== Climate ==
Climate data for Jimsar, elevation 743 m (2,438 ft), (1991–2020 normals, extremes 1981–present)
| Month | Jan | Feb | Mar | Apr | May | Jun | Jul | Aug | Sep | Oct | Nov | Dec | Year |
|---|---|---|---|---|---|---|---|---|---|---|---|---|---|
| Record high °C (°F) | 9.0 (48.2) | 7.9 (46.2) | 26.8 (80.2) | 34.2 (93.6) | 36.6 (97.9) | 39.2 (102.6) | 41.6 (106.9) | 40.9 (105.6) | 38.2 (100.8) | 31.2 (88.2) | 24.0 (75.2) | 11.4 (52.5) | 41.6 (106.9) |
| Mean daily maximum °C (°F) | −9.0 (15.8) | −5.0 (23.0) | 6.4 (43.5) | 19.4 (66.9) | 25.5 (77.9) | 30.3 (86.5) | 31.9 (89.4) | 30.8 (87.4) | 25.1 (77.2) | 15.9 (60.6) | 3.9 (39.0) | −6.4 (20.5) | 14.1 (57.3) |
| Daily mean °C (°F) | −14.4 (6.1) | −10.3 (13.5) | 0.8 (33.4) | 12.6 (54.7) | 18.7 (65.7) | 23.9 (75.0) | 25.5 (77.9) | 23.9 (75.0) | 17.8 (64.0) | 9.0 (48.2) | −1.3 (29.7) | −11.3 (11.7) | 7.9 (46.2) |
| Mean daily minimum °C (°F) | −18.1 (−0.6) | −14.3 (6.3) | −3.5 (25.7) | 6.8 (44.2) | 12.4 (54.3) | 17.9 (64.2) | 19.7 (67.5) | 17.9 (64.2) | 11.8 (53.2) | 4.1 (39.4) | −5.0 (23.0) | −14.7 (5.5) | 2.9 (37.2) |
| Record low °C (°F) | −33.7 (−28.7) | −31.4 (−24.5) | −25.7 (−14.3) | −8.9 (16.0) | −2.0 (28.4) | 4.2 (39.6) | 10.3 (50.5) | 4.4 (39.9) | −1.6 (29.1) | −10.3 (13.5) | −27.3 (−17.1) | −33.8 (−28.8) | −33.8 (−28.8) |
| Average precipitation mm (inches) | 7.1 (0.28) | 7.0 (0.28) | 10.6 (0.42) | 15.2 (0.60) | 21.0 (0.83) | 21.5 (0.85) | 31.5 (1.24) | 30.3 (1.19) | 16.5 (0.65) | 13.2 (0.52) | 12.9 (0.51) | 11.4 (0.45) | 198.2 (7.82) |
| Average precipitation days (≥ 0.1 mm) | 6.5 | 5.6 | 4.6 | 5.5 | 5.9 | 6.5 | 8.1 | 5.9 | 4.2 | 4.4 | 5.8 | 7.6 | 70.6 |
| Average snowy days | 13.4 | 11.4 | 6.3 | 2.1 | 0.1 | 0 | 0 | 0 | 0.1 | 1.3 | 7.3 | 13.7 | 55.7 |
| Average relative humidity (%) | 79 | 78 | 66 | 43 | 39 | 39 | 42 | 42 | 43 | 55 | 72 | 80 | 57 |
| Mean monthly sunshine hours | 132.8 | 157.0 | 227.1 | 260.3 | 299.1 | 292.7 | 293.6 | 288.9 | 266.5 | 231.2 | 156.7 | 117.5 | 2,723.4 |
| Percentage possible sunshine | 46 | 52 | 60 | 64 | 65 | 63 | 63 | 68 | 73 | 69 | 55 | 43 | 60 |
Source: China Meteorological Administrationall-time extreme temperatureall-time August high
