= Longyou Protectorate =

Protectorate of the Chinese Northern Song dynasty

The Longyou Protectorate (Chinese: 隴右都護府) was a protectorate of the Northern Song dynasty. It was created in 1104 after the Northern Song had occupied the former territories of Tsongkha, in what is now northern Qinghai.
