= Ashina Xian =

- Xingxiwang Qaghan (興昔亡可汗)
- Reign: 708–717
- Predecessor: Ashina Huaidao
- Successor: Ashina Zhen
- Died: 717? Chang'an, Tang dynasty
- Issue: Ashina Zhen
Names
- Ashina Xian (阿史那獻)
- House: Ashina
- Dynasty: Western Turkic Khaganate
- Father: Ashina Yuanqing

Ashina Xian (Chinese: 阿史那獻), also known as Shi Xian (史獻), was a puppet qaghan of the Western Turkic Khaganate, appointed by the Tang dynasty. He was also a military general of the Tang dynasty, serving in various roles including Protector-General of Beiting (北庭都護), Protector-General of Kunling (昆陵都護), and Qixi Jiedushi (磧西節度使).

== Life ==
When Ashina Xian's father was executed by Lai Junchen in 692, he was exiled to Yazhou. However, he was recalled to court in 703.

In 708, he was appointed Xingxiwang Khagan (Chinese: 興昔亡可汗; lit. 'The khagan who makes fallen to rise again') by Emperor Zhongzong of Tang. However, Saqal was appointed as his subordinate, who was going to be appointed Shisixing Khagan (Chinese: 十四姓可汗; lit. 'Khagan of Fourteen Tribes') later.

In 714, after the death of Saqal at the Battle of Bolchu, Xian was made Qixi (磧西) Military Commissioner and sent to Suyab to fill the power vacuum.

Nevertheless, when Suluk rose to prominence, the Tang appointed Ashina Xian as the Shixing Qaghan in 716 and appointed Suluk as his deputy, to appease Suluk. Suluk's growing ambition over Xian's overlordship resulted in war and the defeat of Xian in June and July in 717.

After his defeat, he left for Chang'an and died sometime during the reign of Emperor Xuanzong. His successor was his son Ashina Zhen.
