= Beshbalik =

Beshbalik Beshbalik
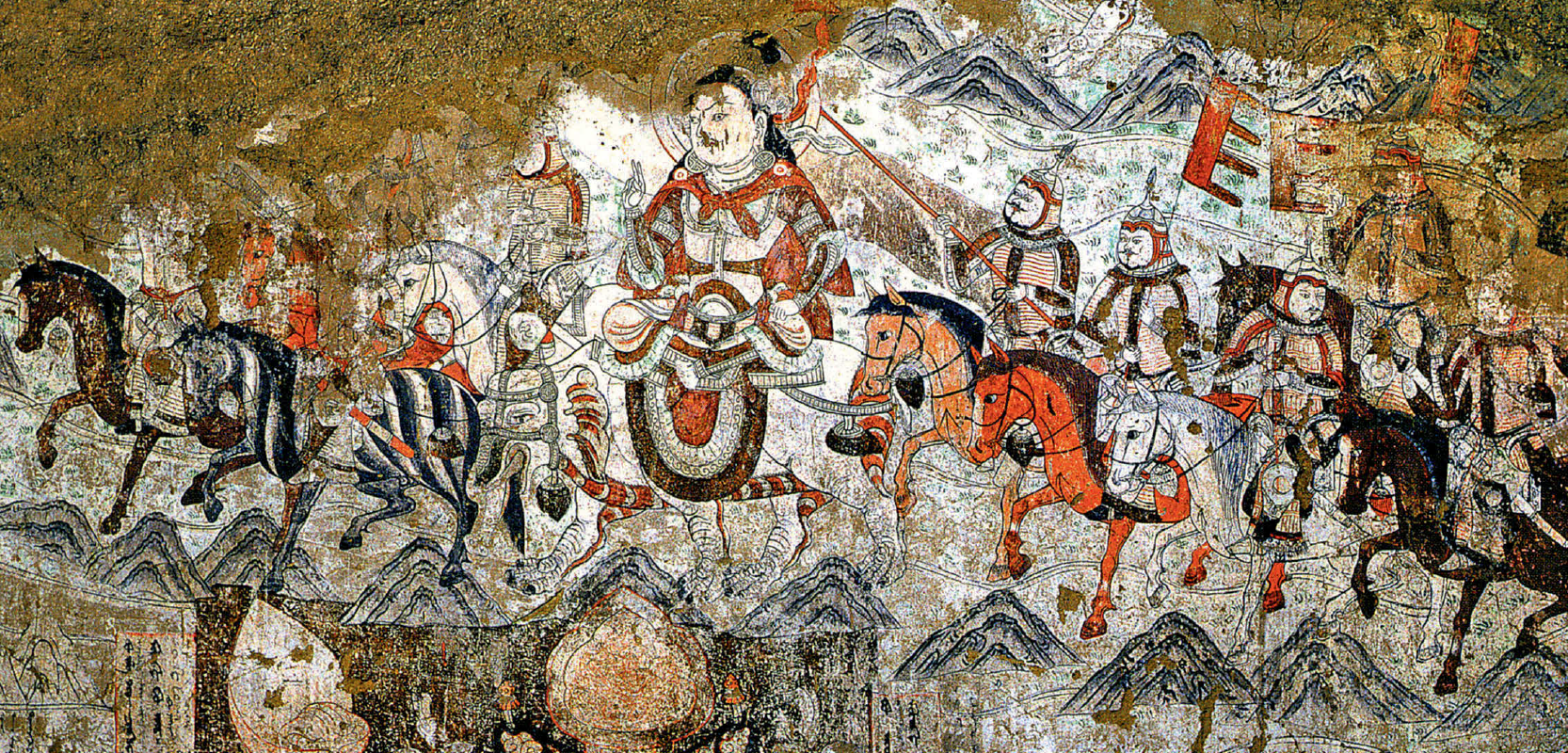
- Mural from West Temple, Beshbalik, 10th c.

- Location within Xinjiang
- Coordinates: 44.092366°N 89.205909°E
- Country: People's Republic of China
- Autonomous region: Xinjiang
- Autonomous prefecture: Changji Hui Autonomous Prefecture
- Township-level divisions: 4 towns 4 townships
- County seat: Jimsar Town (吉木萨尔镇)
- Time zone: UTC+8 (China Standard)

Beshbalik (Note: simplified Chinese: 别失八里; traditional Chinese: 別失八里; pinyin: Biéshībālǐ; Cantonese Yale: Bihtsātbaatléih; Dungan: Бәшыбали) is an ancient Turkic archaeological site, now located in Jimsar County, Changji Hui Autonomous Prefecture, Xinjiang, China. The ancient city was initially called Beiting (Note: Chinese: 北庭; pinyin: Běitíng) or Ting Prefecture, (Note: Chinese: 庭州; pinyin: Tíngzhōu) and was the headquarters of the Beiting Protectorate during the 8th century. It was later known as Beshbalik (Old Uyghur: beş balık 'five cities') and became one of the capitals of the Uyghur Khaganate and then the Kingdom of Qocho.

== Etymology ==
The name of tíng 庭 ('court') comes from this place of being a royal residence of the Further Jūshī 車師 people. Its Old Turkic name, Beşbalık 'five cities' (beş 'five' + balık 'city'), comes from the fact that it was composed of five cities. This is made clear by a passage in the Old Book of Tang:

金滿流沙州北，前漢烏孫部舊地，方五千里。後漢車師後王庭。胡故庭有五城，俗號「五城之地」。貞觀十四年平高昌後，置庭州以前，故及突厥常居之。

North of Jīnmǎn (金滿) in the Shifting Sands region, [it is] the former territory of the Wūsūn (烏孫) tribe of the Former Hàn dynasty. It is thousand lǐ square. [It was] the further royal court (wángtíng 王庭) of the Jūshī (車師). In the old barbarian court, there were five cities: it was thus commonly called "the territory of five cities." After the pacification of Gāochāng in the fourteenth year of the zhēnguān era (640), before, the Tíng Prefecture was established [there], the [area] was frequently inhabited by the Tūjué.

The History of Yuan records the name as both Wǔchéng 五城 (5 cities) and Biéshībālǐ 别失八里.

== History ==
The name Beshbalik first appears in history in the description of the events of 713 in the Turkic Kul Tigin inscription. It was one of the largest of five towns in the Uyghur Khaganate. The Tibetans briefly held the city in 790.

After the Yenisei Kyrgyz sacked the Uyghur capital of Ordu-Baliq in 840 CE, a significant part of the Uyghur Khaganate population fled to the area of the present Jimsar County and Tarim Basin in general in 840, where they founded the Kingdom of Qocho. The Uyghurs submitted to Genghis Khan in 1207. Beshbalik consisted of five parts: an outer town, the northern gate of the outer town, the extended town of the west, the inner town and a small settlement within the inner town. At first, the city was the political center of the Uyghur Idiquit (monarch) and his Mongol queen, Altalun, daughter of Genghis Khan under the Mongol Empire in the first half of the 13th century. Alans were recruited into the Mongol forces with one unit called "Right Alan Guard" which was combined with "recently surrendered" soldiers, Mongols, and Chinese soldiers stationed in the area of the former Kingdom of Qocho and in Besh Balikh the Mongols established a Chinese military colony led by Chinese general Qi Kongzhi (Ch'i Kung-chih). Due to military struggles between the Chagatai Khanate and the Yuan dynasty during the reign of Kublai Khan, the city was abandoned and lost its prosperity in the late 13th century.

== Location and urban layout ==
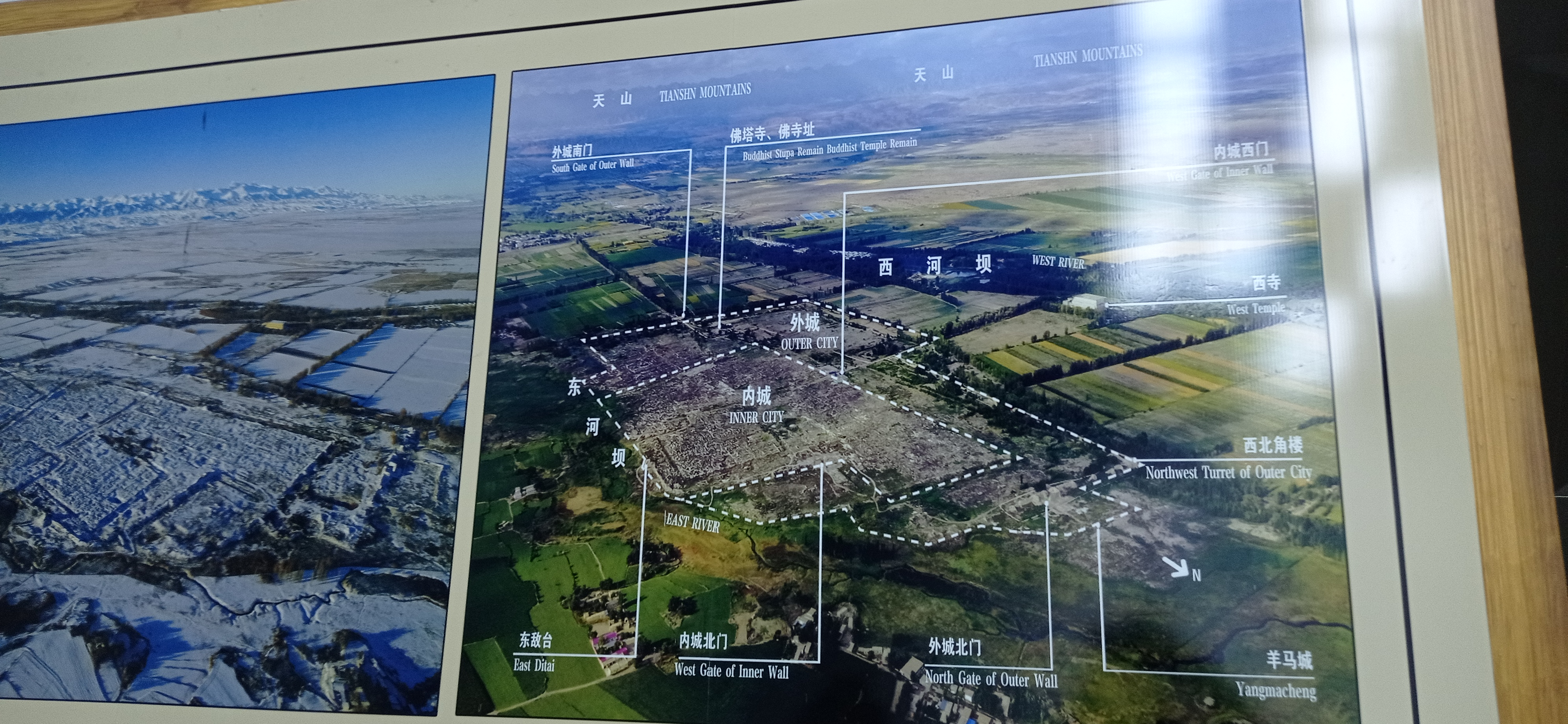
Map of the site

Beiting/Beshbalik occupies an irregular 1.5 km^{2} (0.58 sq mi) core area on the northern fringes of the Tianshan Mountains. Its outer enclosure measures roughly 1.5 km (N–S) by 1.0 km (E–W), with an inner citadel set centrally; both rings feature moats, earthen ramparts, barbicans, bastions and corner towers. The city is divided between an inner city (內城) and outer city (外城).

== Fortifications and infrastructure ==
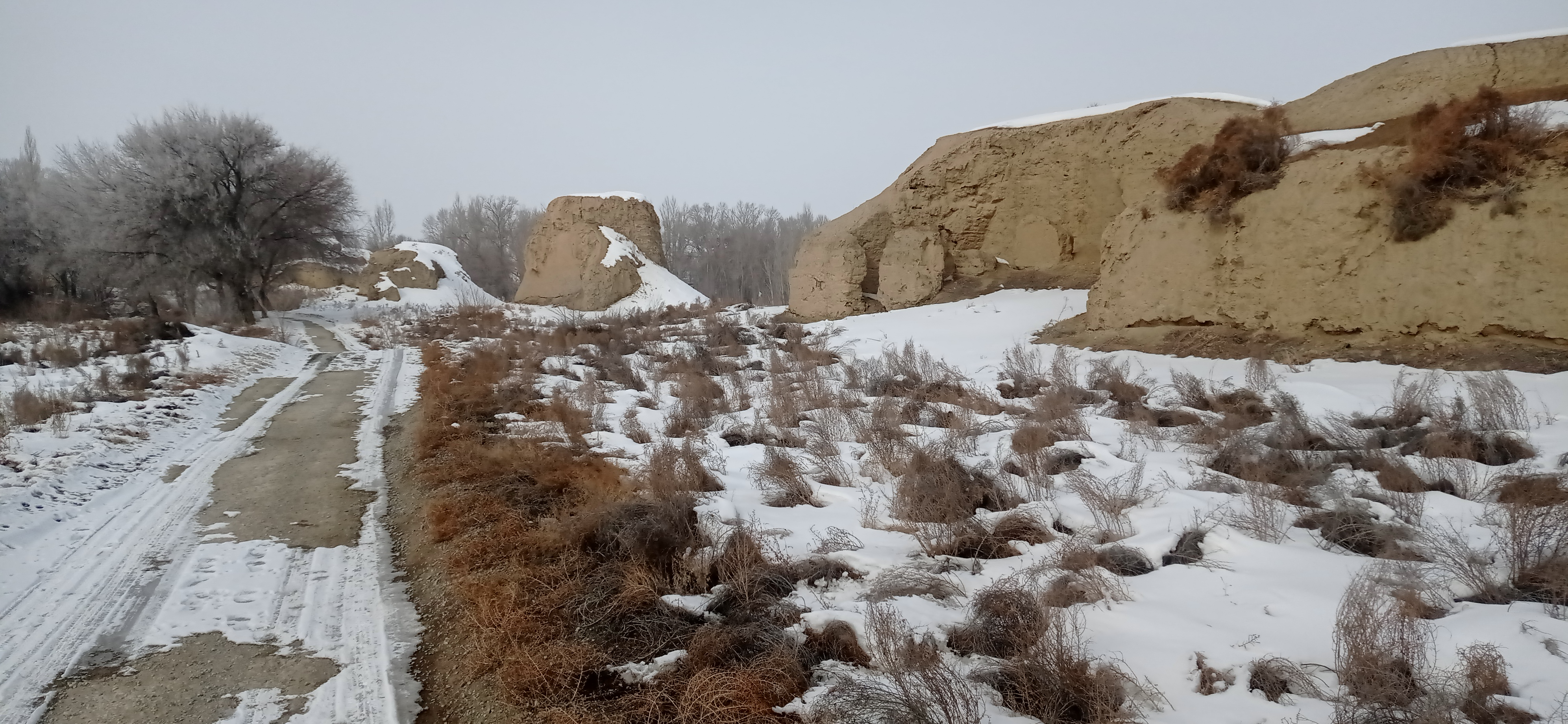
Inner wall

Concentric Walls: Both inner and outer walls are faced with rammed earth and reinforced at intervals by protruding bastions (马面) and corner towers (角楼) overlooking wide moats.

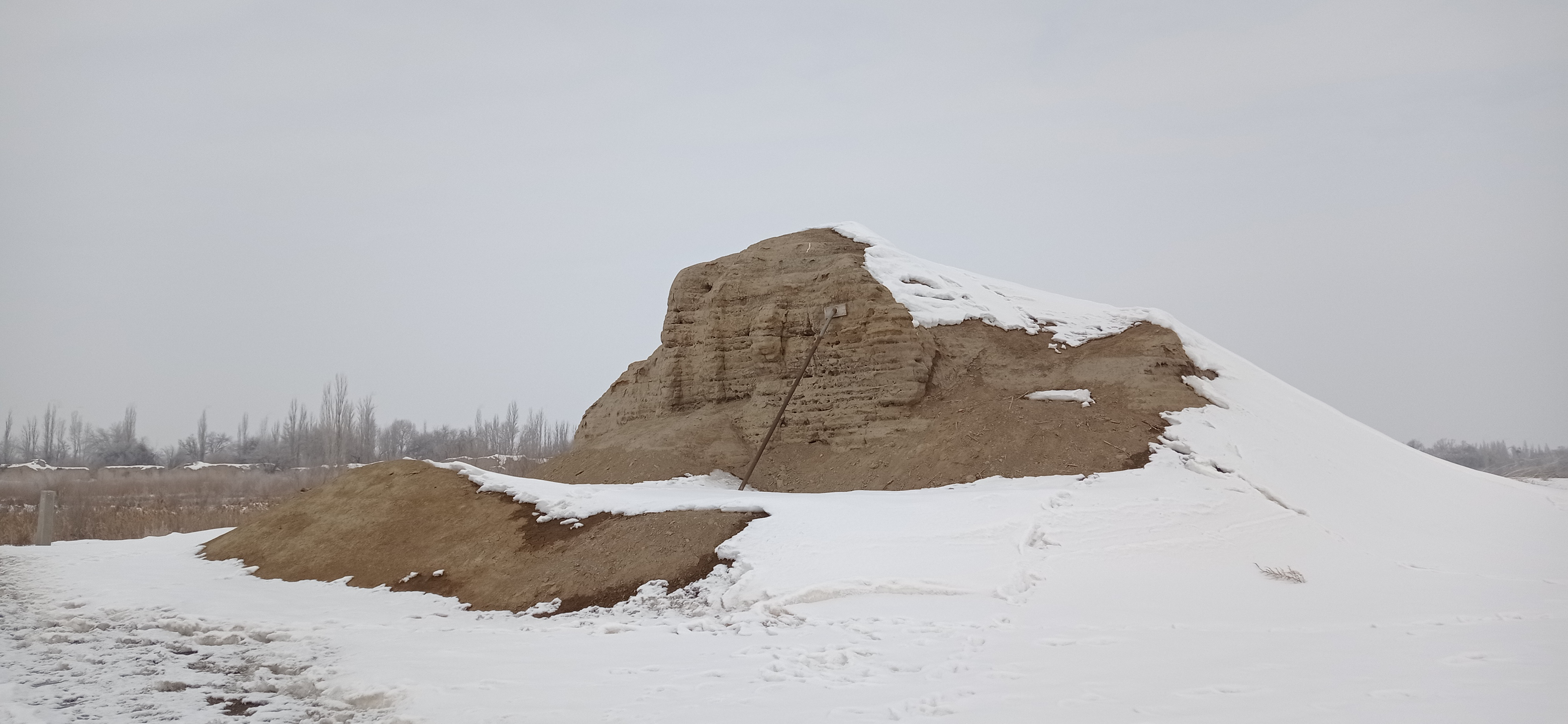
West gate of the inner wall

Gate Complexes: Archaeologists have identified at least four gate foundations, each fronted by barbicans and flanked by watchtowers, channeling traffic along the main N–S and E–W thoroughfares.

== Stratigraphy and cultural phases ==
Excavation reports distinguish several occupation layers:

- Tang (8th c.): the extant main body of the ancient city's outer wall as well as inner wall were constructed in the Tang dynasty.
- Uyghur (9th–13th c.): During the Gaochang Uyghur and Mongol periods, the overall layout of Tang‑era Beiting was essentially retained, with only localized repairs and modifications.

== Recent excavations and discoveries ==
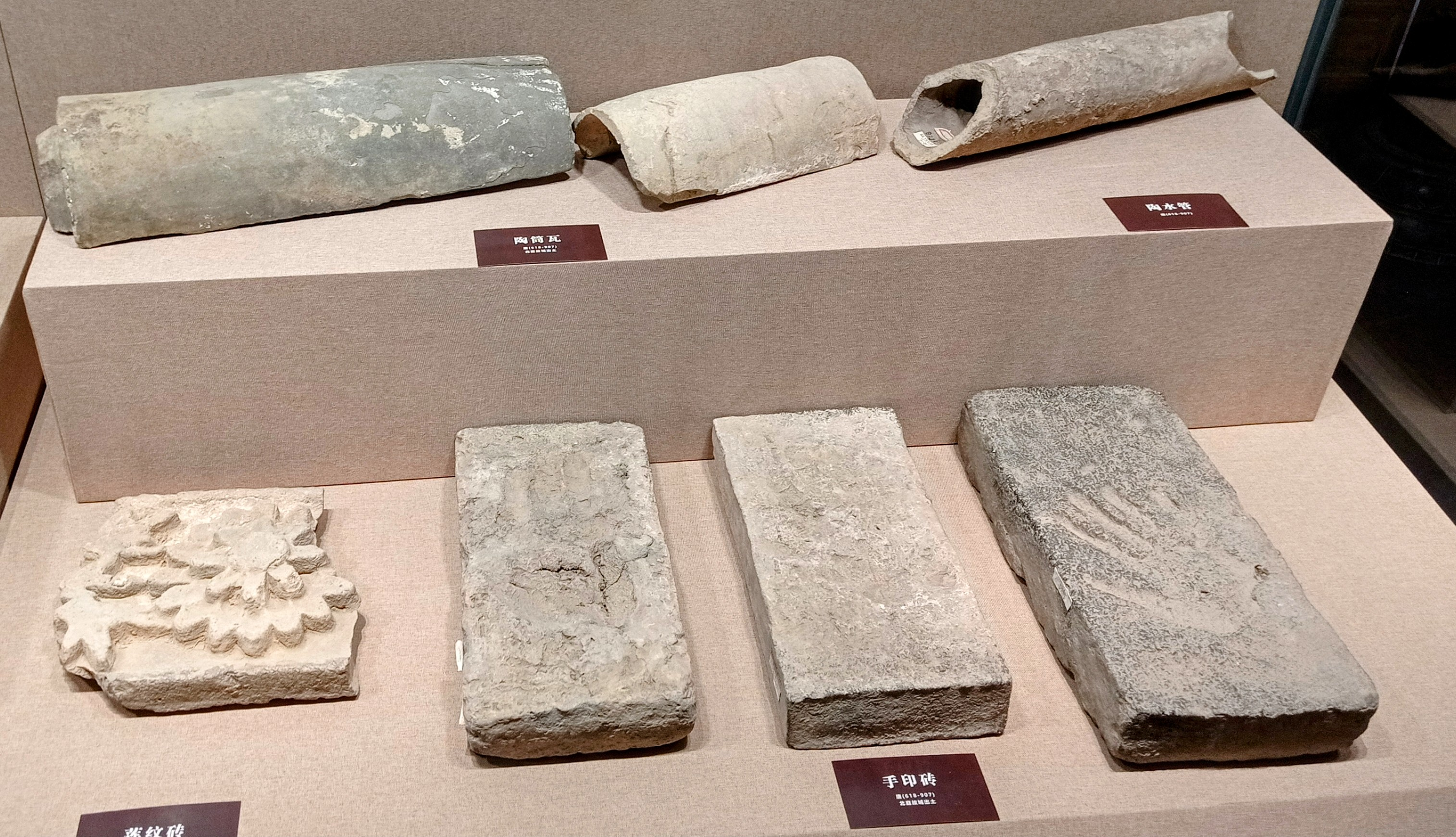
Tiles found in the site of Beshbalik

Since 2018, led by Prof. Guo Wu (郭物), teams from the Chinese Academy of Social Sciences and Xinjiang Archaeological Institute have doubled annual trenching—from 700 m² (2018) to 1 600 m² (2024)—revealing:

- yellow‑green glazed dragon‑body architectural fittings;
- pottery sherds inscribed with the temple name "悲田寺" (Bēitián sì);
- the silver seal of Púlèi Prefecture ("蒲类州之印"), Kaiyuan Tongbao coins, and fragments of lotus‑petal patterned roof tiles.

== Běitíng/Beshbalik in literary texts ==
On his way back from a pilgrimage to India, Wukong spent several months in Běitíng, where he translated a sūtra. He gives the following account of his activities:

He then left that place and arrived in the Běitíng District (北庭州); the deputy administrator of this district, the yùshǐ dàfū Yáng Xígǔ (楊襲古), together with the monks of the Lóngxīng (龍興) Temple, asked the senior śramaņa of the Yútián (Khotan) Kongdom, Shīluódámó (尸羅達摩) (Śīladharma), to translate the Shídì jīng (Daśabhūmika-sūtra). The senior monk read the Sanskrit text and translated the words; the śramaṇa Dàzhèn (大震) wrote it down; the śramaṇa Fǎchāo (法超) polished the style; the śramaṇa Shànxìn (善信) verified the meaning; the śramaṇa Fǎjiè (法界) verified the Sanskrit text and the translation. The translation of the Huíxiànglúnjīng was done in the same way. When sūtra translations were completed and the copying was nearing its end, it so happened that the general protector of the Four Garrisons and of Běitíng, the imperial envoy Duàn Míngxiù (段明秀), arrived at Běitíng; then in the fifth year of zhēnyuán (789 CE), the year being in the jǐsì signs, on the thirteenth day of the ninth month, with Niú Xīn (牛昕), secretary (押衙) of the administrator and intendant of petitions for that district, with Chéng È (程鍔) intendant of petitions for that district, and with other people, he followed the envoy to the court. At that time, as the river of sand (the Gobi) was impassable, he took the Huíhú (Uyghur) route. However, as the Chányú was not a Buddhist believer, he did not dare to take with him the Sanskrit books he had collected; he left them in the library of the Lóngxīng Temple in Běitíng. He brought the Chinese translations he had made to the capital with the envoy.

In the sixth year of the tàipíng xīngguó (太平興國) era (981 CE), Wáng Yándé 王延德 and Bái Xūn 白勳 led a Song dynasty embassy to the Gāochāng Uyghur kingdom. They were invited north to Běitíng, where the king was staying. They described the region as follows:

Crossing the mountain pass in a day, [they] arrived at Běitíng and stayed at Gāotái Temple ("Temple of Elevated Plateform"). The king prepared a meal of cooked sheep and horses, which was especially abundant and lavish.

The land had many horses. The king, queen, and crown prince each raised horses, grazing them in a flat valley, which stretches at more than a hundred lǐ. They were grouped according to the color of their coats, and it was impossible to know their number. The river of Běitíng was spacious and thousands of lǐ long. It was a place where eagles, hawks, and falcons were produced, with many beautiful grasses, but no flowers grew. The sand rats were as big as small rabits, and one catch them with birds of prey catch to eat them.

The king sent a messenger to select a date to meet the embassadors, to avoid being accused of negligence or slowness. On the seventh day, the envoys met the king and his princes, and their attendants, all facing east to receive gifts. Those holding bells struck them in rhythm, and the king bowed upon hearing the bells. Afterwards, the king's children and relatives all came out, prostrated themselves, and received the gifts. Then they began to play music and hold a banquet, performing various entertainments until dusk.The next day, they sailed in boats on a pond, with music and drums on all four sides. The day after that, they visited Buddhist temples called Yìngyùn Temple and Tàiníng Temple, which were built in the fourteenth year of the zhēnguān period (640 CE).

Salammoniac (硇砂) is produced in the northern mountains of Běitíng. Plumes of smoke continually rise from inside the mountains, which are never [covered by] clouds or mist. At dusk, the light and flames are like torches, lluminating birds and rodents, all of which appear red. Those who gather it wear wooden-soled shoes to collect it; if there were [made] of leather, they would burn immediately.. Below, there are caves producing blue mud, which turns into sand and stone once it exits the cave. The local people use it to treat leather.

Within the city are many towers and pavilions, flowers and trees. The people are fair-skinned, upright, and of an artistic nature. They are skilled at crafting gold, silver, copper, and iron into vessels, as well as carving jade. A good horse is worth one bolt of silk, while an inferior horse, used for food, is only worth one zhàng. The poor all eat meat. To the west, it reaches Ānxī, which was the western border of the Táng.

== Temples ==
=== West Temple (西寺) ===
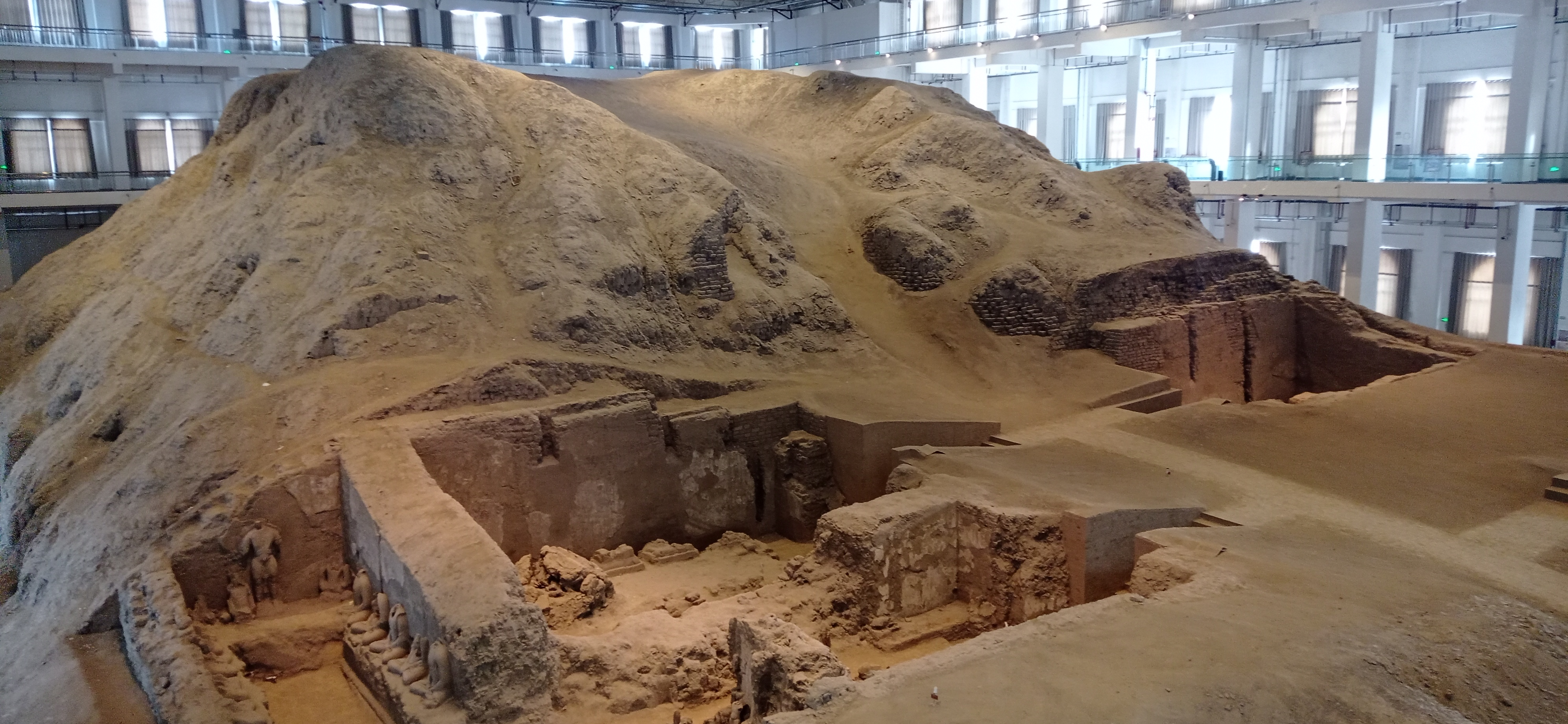
Western Temple – View from the south-west corner

The West Temple (Chinese: 西寺, Xī Sì) is one of the principal Buddhist sanctuaries of the ancient Beiting/Beshbalik site, situated on the east bank of the western river embankment terrace, approximately 700 m west of the city walls. It was constructed during the Gaochang Uyghur period, spanning from the mid‑10th to the mid‑13th century, and served as the royal temple of the Uyghur Khaganate's Qocho kingdom.

The West Temple was first documented archaeologically in 1979–1980, when the Xinjiang team of the Chinese Academy of Social Sciences conducted a systematic survey and excavation, fully exposing the temple foundations and publishing the initial site report.

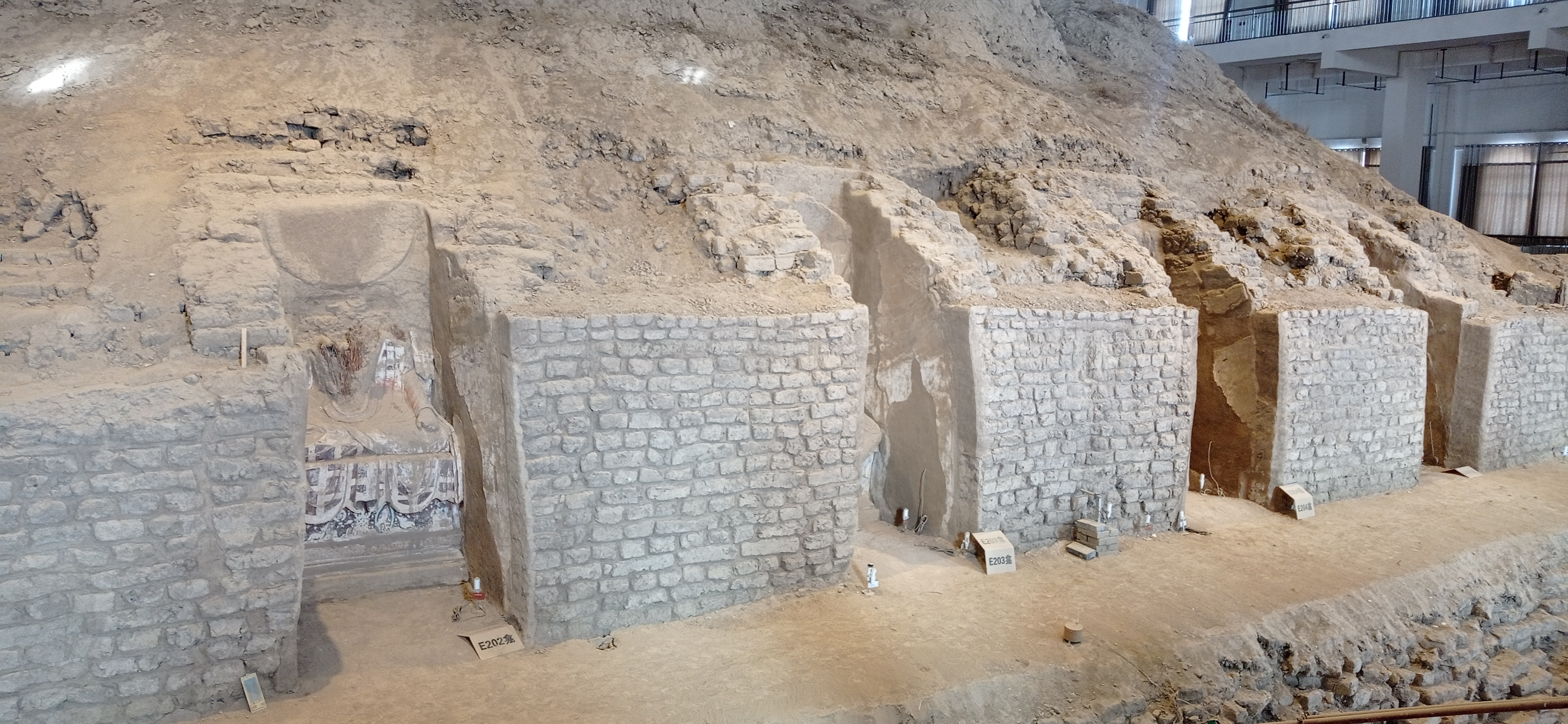
View of the east side sanctuaries

The temple's layout is a north–south‑oriented rectangle with a rammed‑earth podium rising to a surviving height of 14.30 m. Substructures consist of compacted earth, while the superstructure was entirely built of adobe bricks. The southern courtyard includes subsidiary halls, monks’ living quarters, and storerooms, whereas the northern end houses the main hall. On the east, west, and north faces of the podium are cave chambers arranged in three tiers, each containing Buddhist statues and wall paintings. The sculptural program comprises Buddhas, Bodhisattvas, Arhats, Heavenly Kings, and lions; murals depict thousand‑Buddha motifs, Bodhisattvas, donor portraits of Uyghur patronage, protective deities, and jātaka narratives, many bearing bilingual Uyghur and Chinese inscriptions. The ‘King's Procession’ mural depicts the story of the eight kings who fought over the division of the Buddha's relics after his nirvana, and the process of their eventual reconciliation and equal division of the relics.

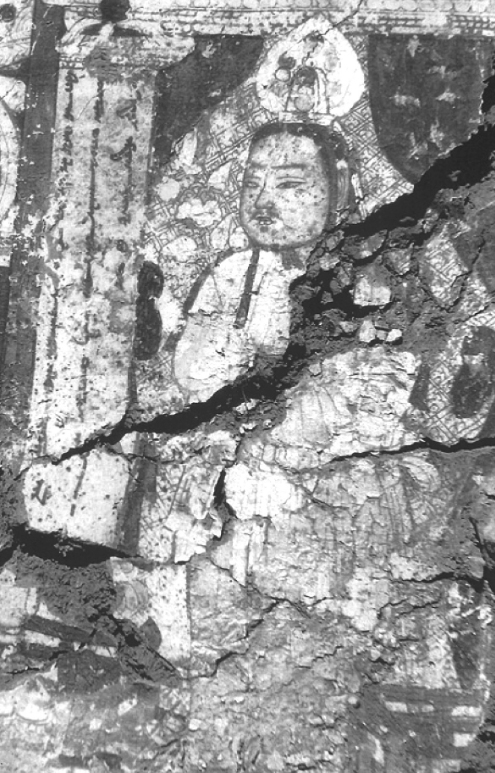
Buddhist painting from Beshbalik

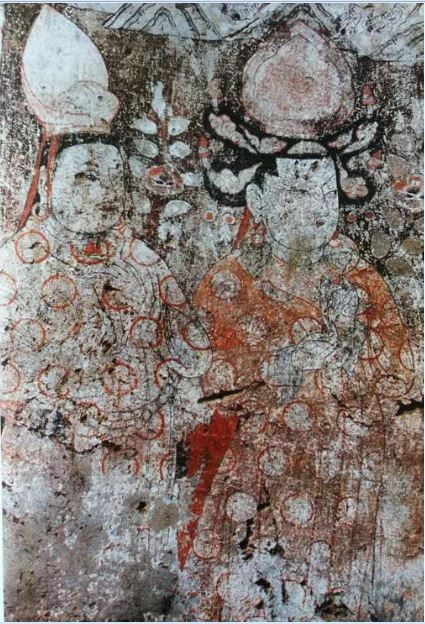
Donors, Beshbalik

== Museum ==
In 2022, a new museum was opened to display archeological objects found on the site.

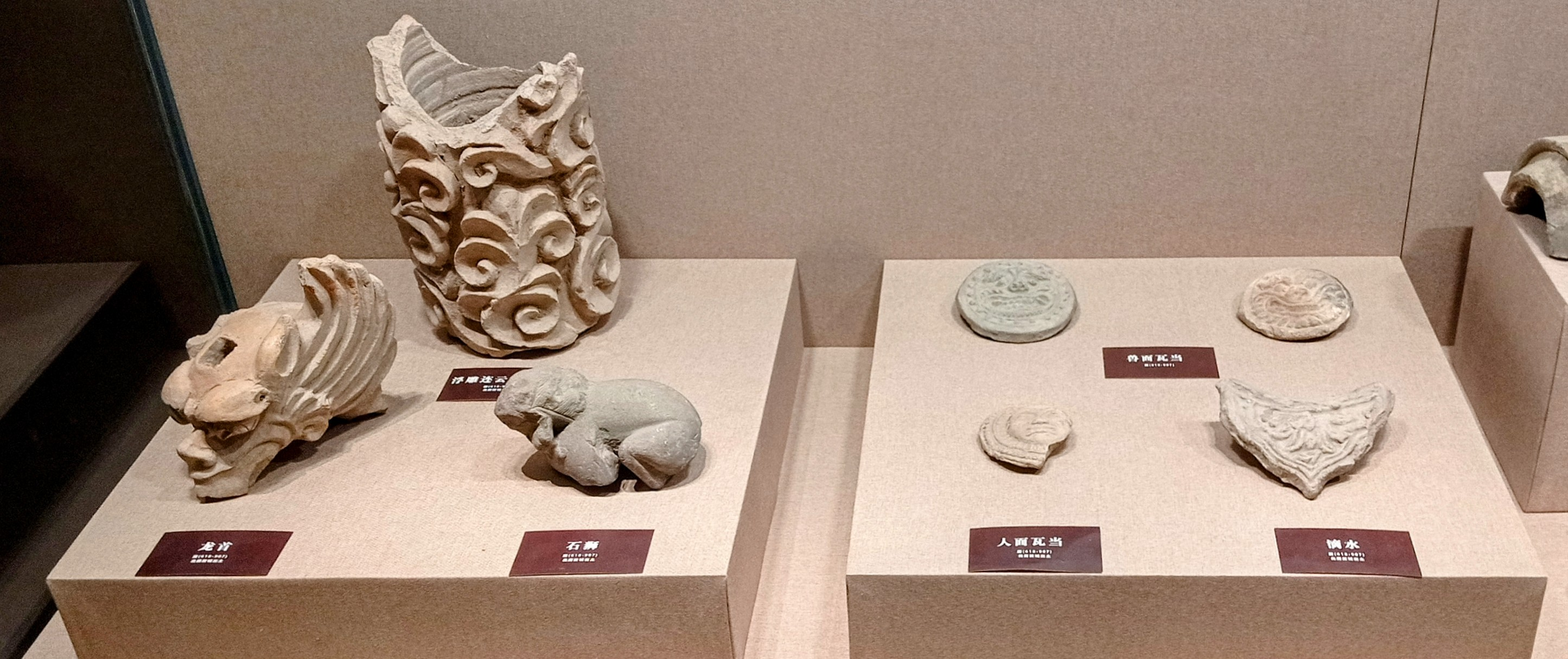
Tiles (Tang dynasty)

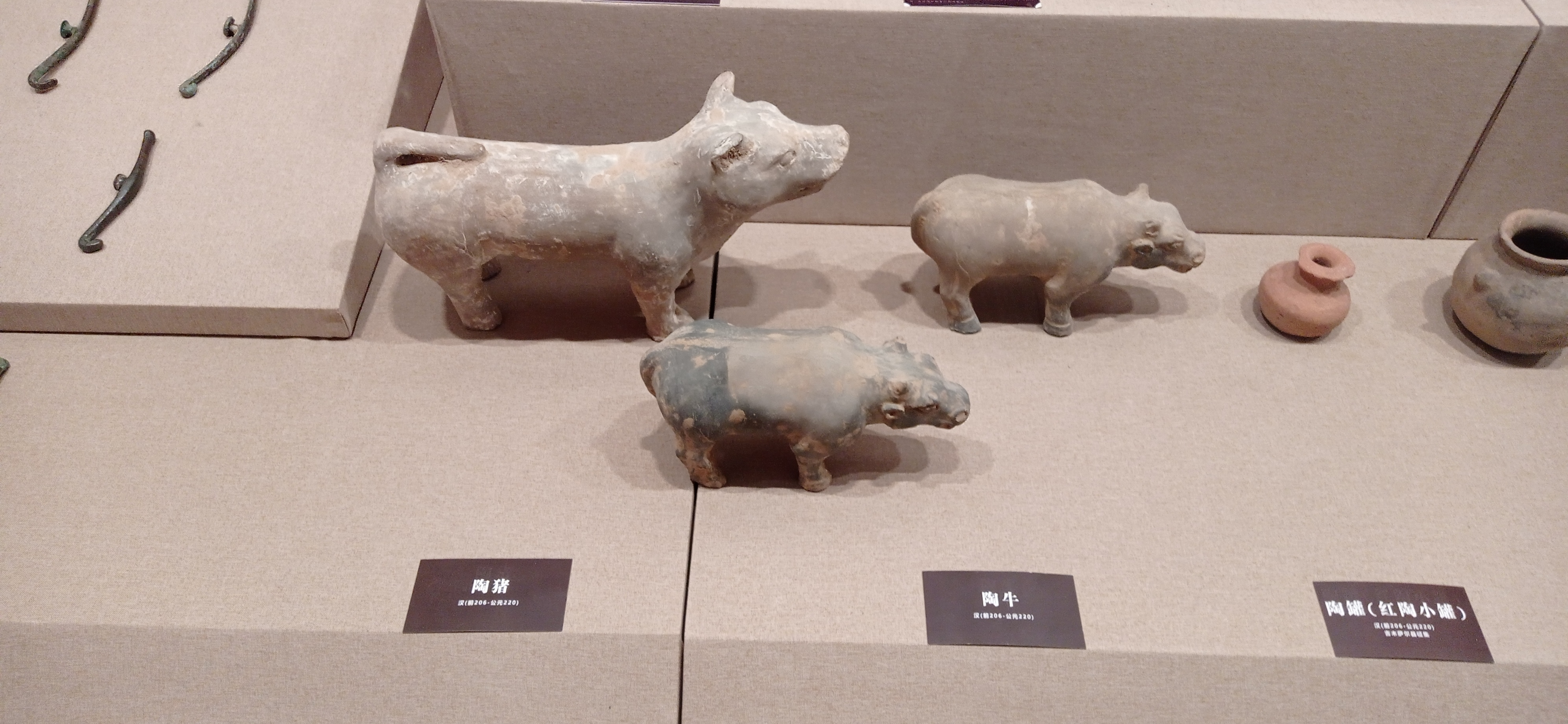
Clay animals (Han dynasty)

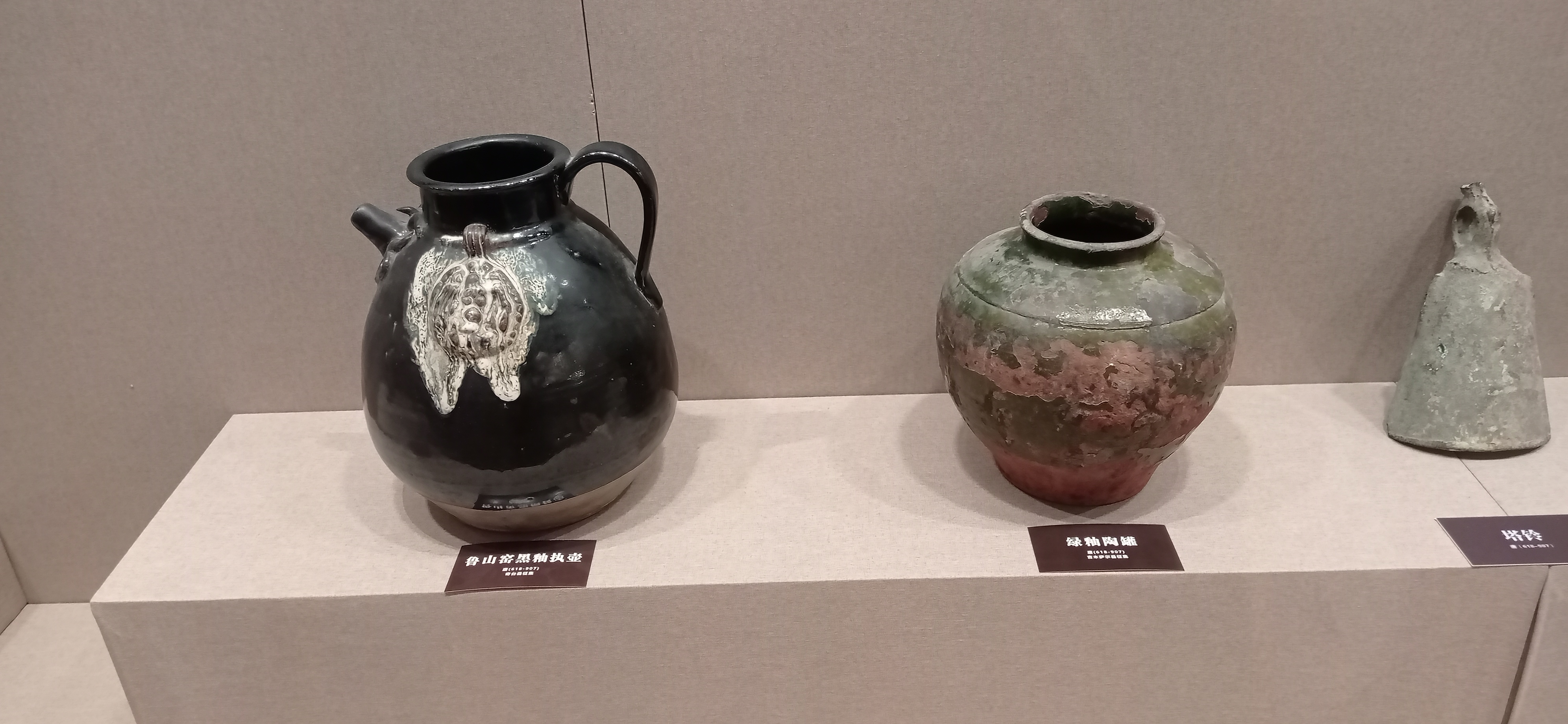
Ceramics (Tang dynasty)
