= Beiting Protectorate =

Tang dynasty administrative region

Beiting Protectorate(-General)
- Traditional Chinese: 北庭(大)都護府
- Simplified Chinese: 北庭(大)都護府
- Literal meaning: (Grand) Protectorate of the Northern Court
Transcriptions
Standard Mandarin
- Hanyu Pinyin: Běitíng (Dà) Dūhùfǔ
- Wade–Giles: Pei-t'ing (Ta) Tu-hu-fu

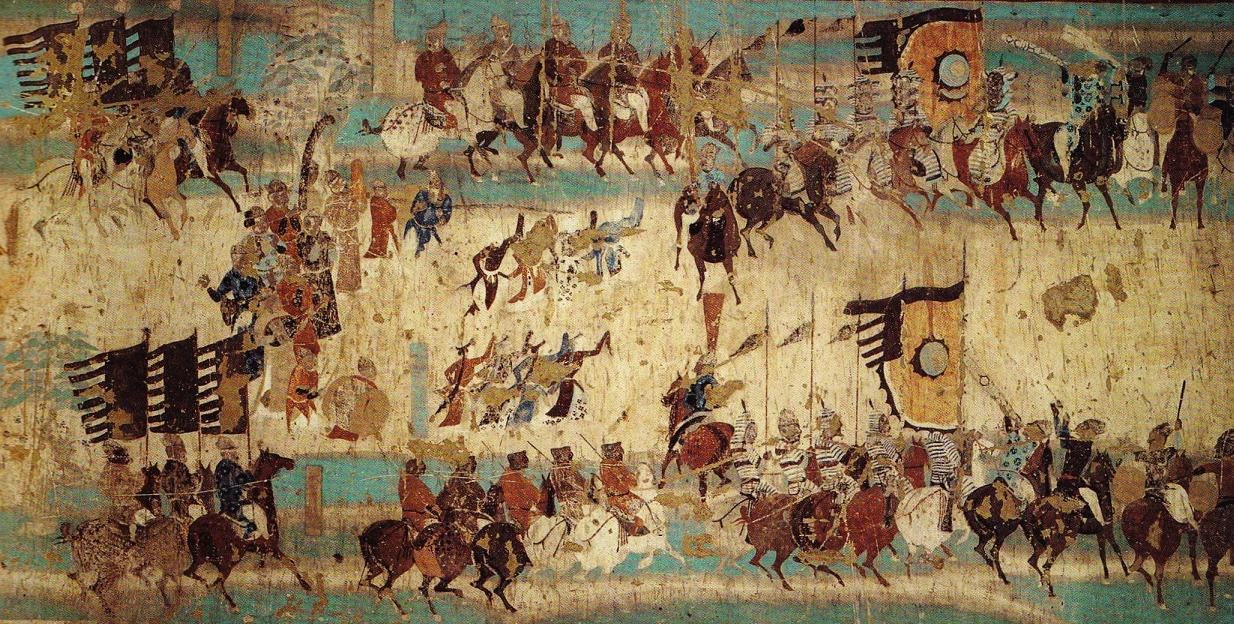
Mural commemorating victory of General Zhang Yichao over the Tibetan Empire in 848 (Mogao cave 156, late Tang dynasty)

The Beiting Protectorate-General, initially the Beiting Protectorate, was a Chinese protectorate established by the Tang dynasty in 702 to control the Beiting region north of Gaochang in modern Xinjiang. Wu Zetian set up the Beiting Protectorate in Ting Prefecture (today Jimsar County) and granted it governorship over Yi Prefecture (Hami) and Xi Prefecture (Gaochang). The Beiting Protectorate ended in 790 when Tingzhou was conquered by the Tibetan Empire. The ruins, along with other sites along the Silk Road, were inscribed in 2014 on the UNESCO World Heritage List as the Silk Roads: the Routes Network of Chang'an-Tianshan Corridor World Heritage Site.

== History ==
In 702 Wu Zetian set up the Beiting Protectorate in Ting Prefecture (Jimsar County) and granted it governorship over Yi Prefecture (Hami) and Xi Prefecture (Gaochang).

In 715 the Tibetan Empire attacked the Beiting Protectorate.

In 735 the Türgesh attacked Ting Prefecture.

At the beginning of 736, Ge Jiayun, the Protector-General of Beiting and Army Commissioner of Hanhai, defeated the Turgesh twice near Beiting (Ting Prefecture).

In 755 the An Lushan Rebellion occurred and the Tang dynasty withdrew 200,000 soldiers from the Western Regions to protect the capital.

In 764 the Tibetan Empire invaded the Hexi Corridor and conquered Liang Prefecture, cutting off the Anxi and Beiting from the Tang dynasty. However the Anxi and Beiting protectorates were left relatively unmolested under the leadership of Guo Xin and Li Yuanzhong.

In 780 Li Yuanzhong was officially made protectorate general of Beiting after sending secret messages to Emperor Dezong of Tang.

In 781 the Tibetan Empire conquered Yi Prefecture.

In 789 the monk Wukong passed through Ting Prefecture and found that the Chinese commander there was Yang Xigu.

In 790 the Tibetan Empire conquered Ting Prefecture.

In 792 the Tibetan Empire conquered Xi Prefecture.

== Post-Tibetan domination ==
In the immediate aftermath of the Tibetan conquest of Xi Prefecture, it was taken by the Uyghur Khaganate, after which the area became the border between the two empires.

Zhang Yichao rebelled against Tibetan rule in Sha Prefecture (Dunhuang) in 848. In 850 he recaptured Yi Prefecture, in 851 Xi Prefecture, and in 866 Ting Prefecture. However he immediately lost Ting and Xi prefectures as well as Luntai (Ürümqi) to the Kingdom of Qocho. In 876 Yi Prefecture was also captured by the Kingdom of Qocho.

== List of protector generals ==
- Zhang Song (張嵩) 722
- Ge Jiayun (蓋嘉運) 736
- Li Gong (李珙) 756
- Li Yuanzhong (李元忠) 780
- Yang Xigu (楊襲古) 789

== Gallery ==
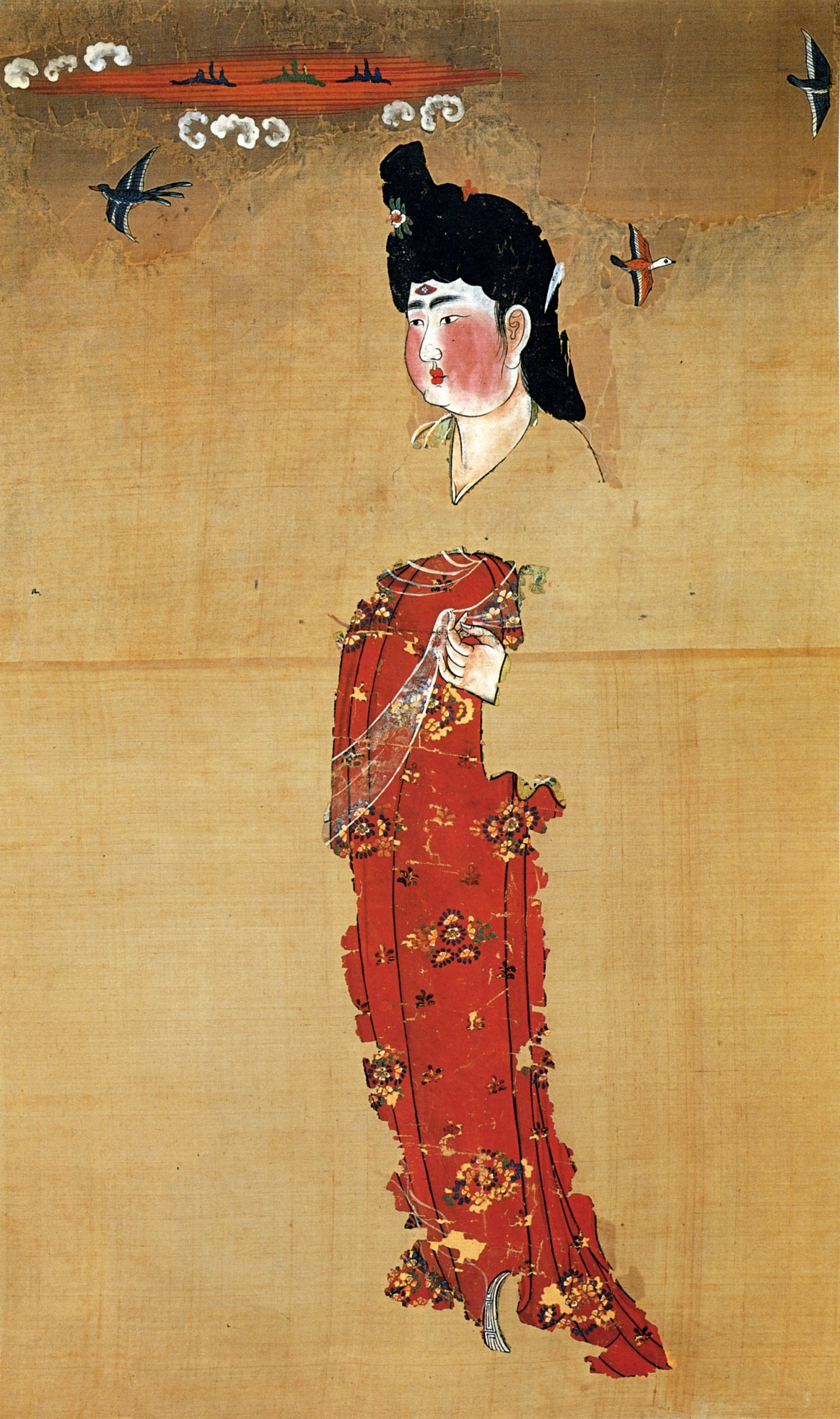
Unearthed at the Astana Graves in 1972 from the tomb number 187. The background contains a bamboo plant. The image was to the right side of an image of a woman playing go. The tomb also contained a copy of the book "Tian Bao San Zai" dated to the year 744.

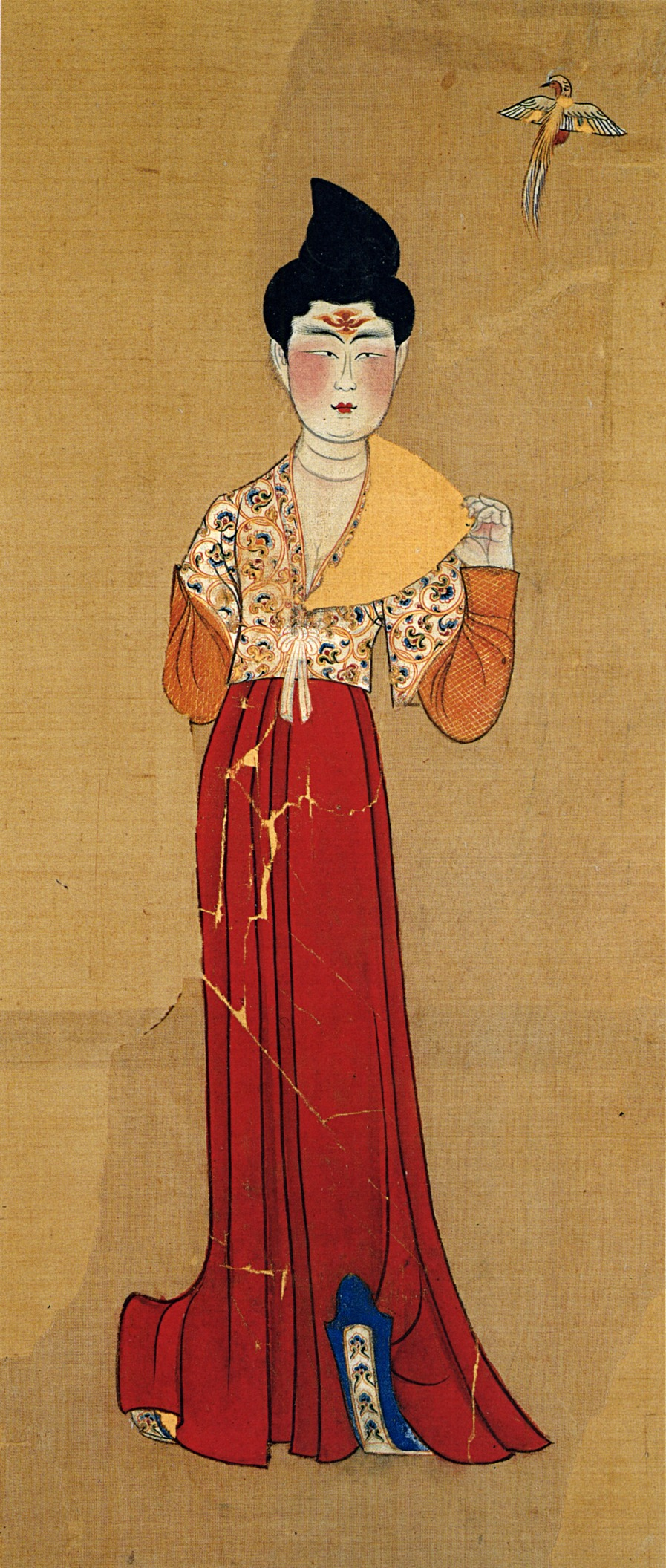
Unearthed at the Astana Graves in 1972 from the tomb of Zhang Lichen (655-702).

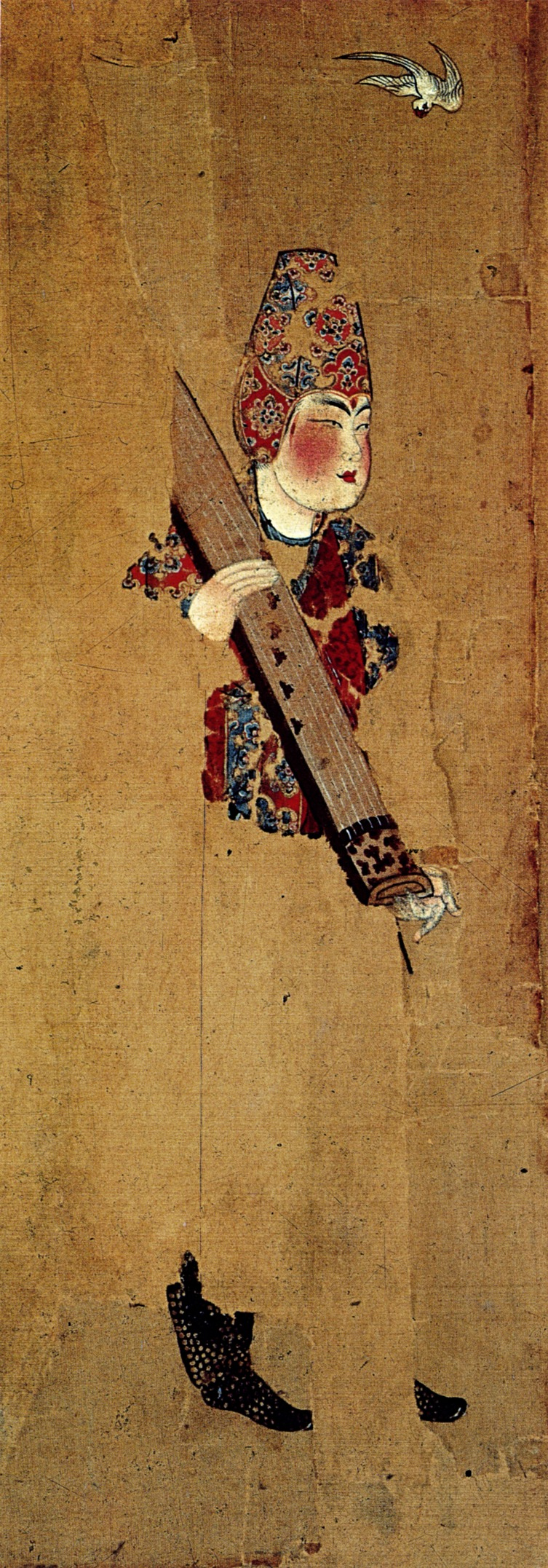
Unearthed in 1972 from the tomb of Zhang Lichen (655-702).

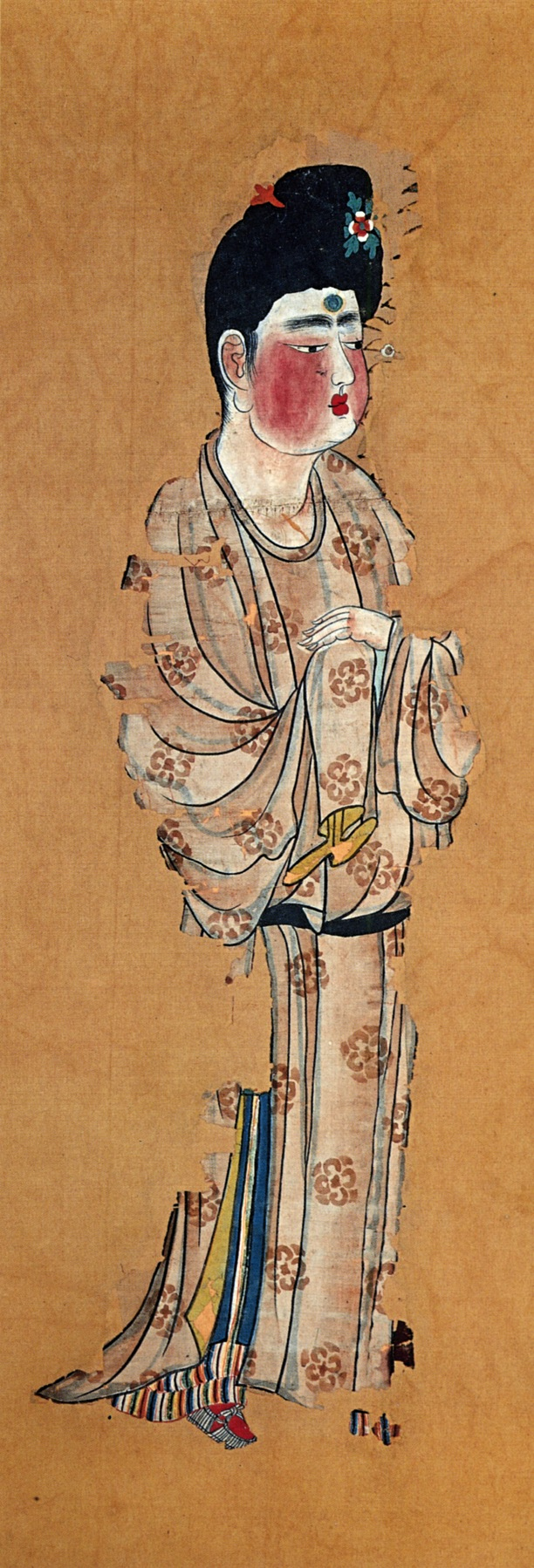
Unearthed at the Astana Graves from the tomb number 187

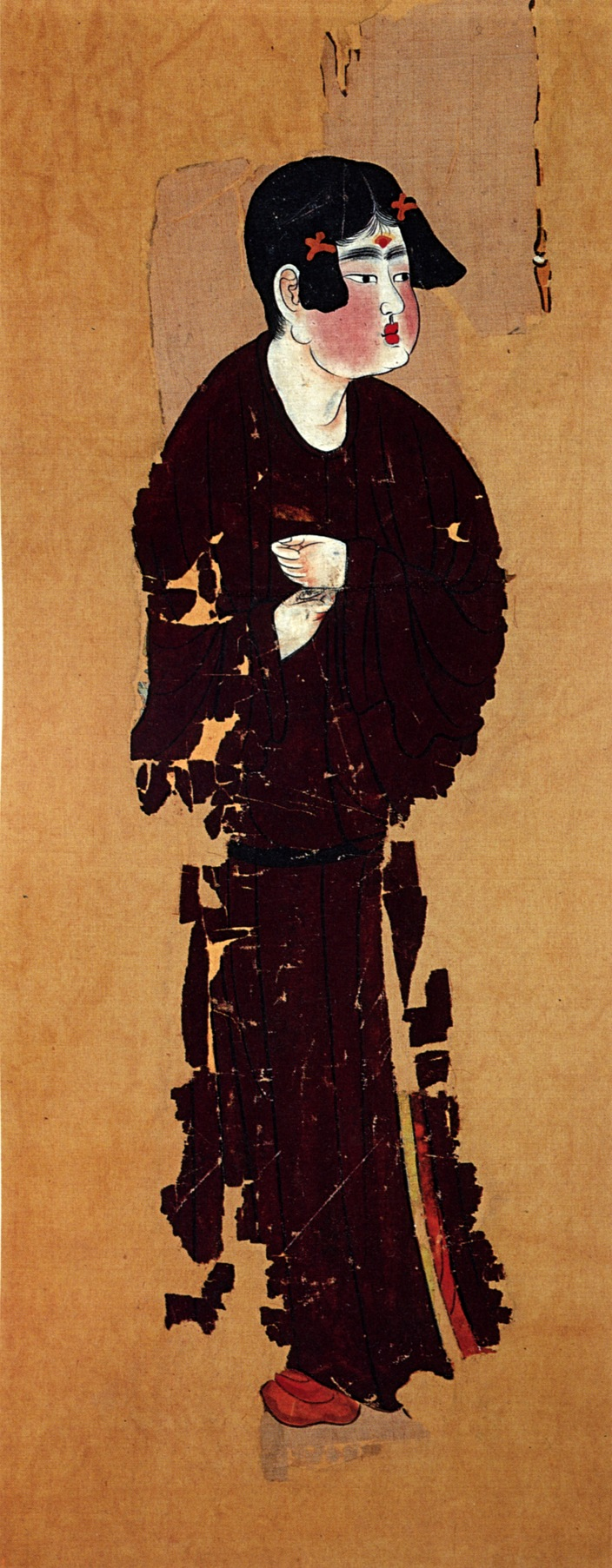
Unearthed at the Astana Graves from the tomb number 187

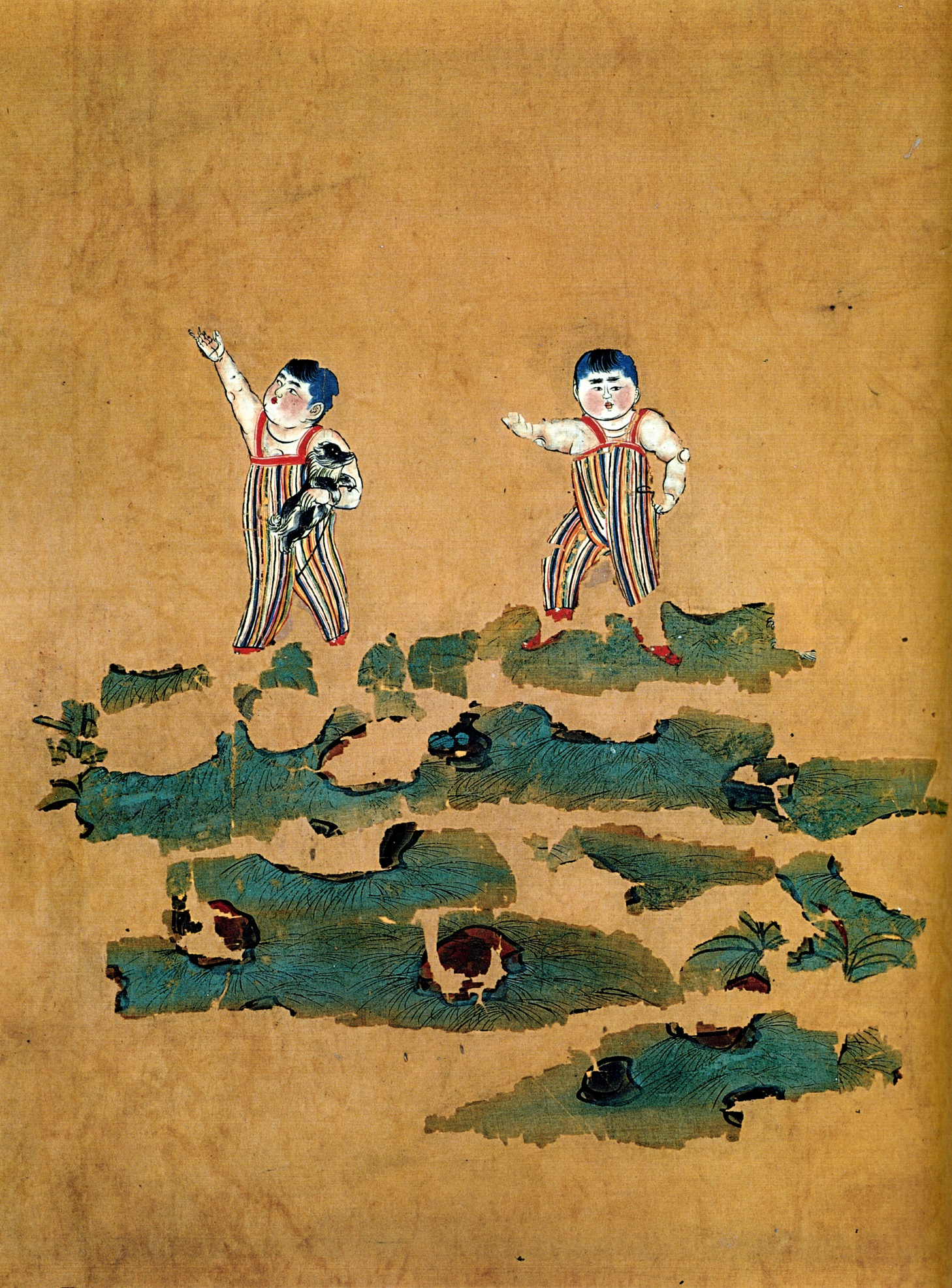
Unearthed at the Astana Graves from the tomb number 187

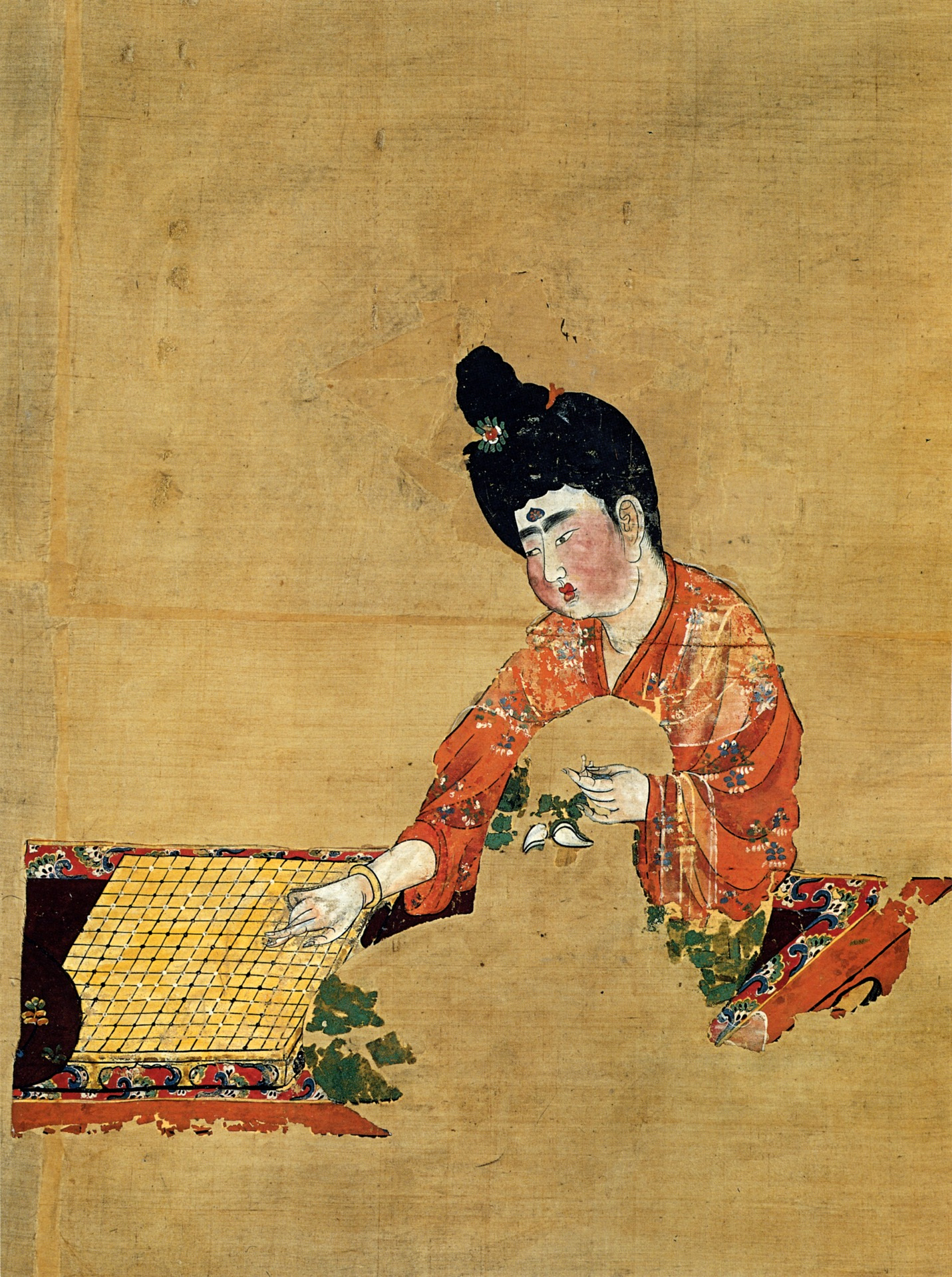
Unearthed at the Astana Graves in 1972 from the tomb number 187. The tomb also contained a copy of the book "Tian Bao San Zai" dated to the year 744.

== See also ==
- Protectorate General to Pacify the West
- Protectorate General to Pacify the North
- Protectorate General to Pacify the East
- Chinese military history
- Horses in East Asian warfare
- Tang dynasty in Inner Asia
