= Yarlha Shampo =

Mountain in Tibet Autonomous Region

- Location within Tibet

Highest point
- Elevation: 6,636 m (21,772 ft)
- Coordinates: 28°48′03″N 91°57′52″E

Geography
- Location: Shannan Prefecture, Tibet Autonomous Region, China

Yarlha Shampo (Tibetan: ཡར་ལྷ་ཤམ་པོ།, Chinese: 雅拉香波) is a sacred mountain located at the head of the Yarlung Valley in Central Tibet. Its summit has an elevation of 6,636 metres (21,772 ft) above sea level.

The mountain deity is considered the ancestor god of the Yarlung kings of Tibet, who later established the Tibetan Empire. According to Tibetan tradition, the divine ancestor descended from the sky to Yarlha Shampo's summit. The mountain deity also acted as the Yarlung kings' proxy in their conflicts with other polities.

Because of the mountain's yak-shaped peak, the mountain god was frequently depicted as a white yak. According to legend, it tried to block Padmasambhava as a mountain-sized yak during the latter's mission to bring Buddhism into Tibet. Padmasambhava successfully defeated and subdued it, until the deity, assuming the form of a young boy with white braids, swore an oath to protect the dharma.
