= Yarlung Valley =

District in Tibet, China

Coordinates: 29°12′N 91°46′E

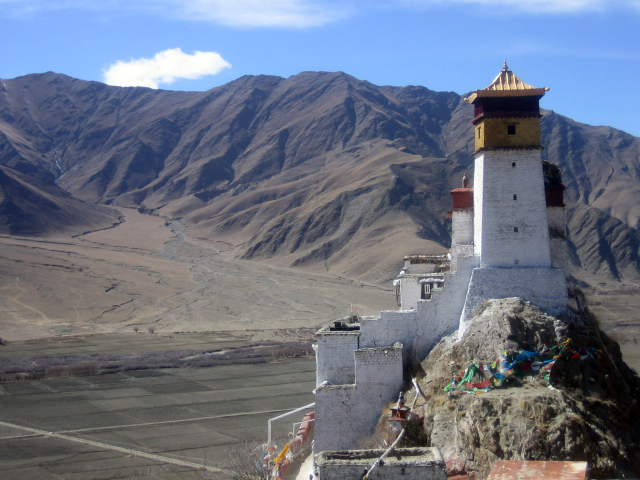
The restored Yungbu Lakang Palace

The Yarlung Valley is formed by Yarlung Chu, a tributary of the Tsangpo River in the Shannan Prefecture in the Tibet autonomous region of China. It refers especially to the district where Yarlung Chu joins with the Chongye River, and broadens out into a large plain about 2 km wide, before it flows into the Tsangpo River. It is situated in Nedong District of the Shannan Prefecture and includes the capital of the prefecture, Tsetang, one of Tibet's largest cities, 183 km southeast of Lhasa.

It was originally well-forested and suitable for agriculture. The Tsetang district is famous for its apples and pears.

The Yarlung and the adjoining Chongye Valley formed the original seat of the Yarlung dynasty of Tibetan kings and controlled important ancient trade routes into India and Bhutan. The first Tibetan Emperor, Songtsen Gampo (605 or 617? - 649), moved the capital to Lhasa after greatly expanding his territories and power.

== Description ==
The Yarlung Valley, widely regarded as the cradle of Tibetan civilization, is 72 km (45 mi) long, and contains a large number of important castles, monasteries, temples, meditation caves, peaks and stupas. There are three renowned power places (ne-sum), Sheldrak, Tradruk, and Yumbu Lagang or (Yungbulakang Palace). Also, there are three major stupas which serve as receptacles for sacred relics (ten-sum): Takchen Bumpa, Gontang Bumpa, and Tsechu Bumpa.

Just below the town of Tsetang there once was a 14th-century iron suspension bridge built across the Yarlung Tsangpo River or Brahmaputra by the famous engineer Tangtong Gyalpo, with a span of 150 to 250 metres, but only five large stone supports are left today. A modern bridge has been built a few kilometres downstream at Nyago. Even when Sarat Das visited in 1879 it was in such a state of disrepair that he had to ferry across the River in a large boat containing traders and their donkeys.

"To the north of the town was the Gonpi ri, one of the favourite resorts of Chenrezig (Avalokitesvara), and where, according to tradition, the monkey king and the goblin raised their family of monkeys, from which ultimately descended the Tibetan race.
There are four lamaseries around Tse-tang, and in the town are some fifteen Nepalese, twenty Chinese, and ten Kashmiri shops, besides native traders from all parts of Tibet. Mutton and butter were abundant, but barley, though cheap, is of inferior quality."

== Major sites of interest ==
- Yungbulakang Palace, also called Yumbu Lakhar. Reputed to be Tibet’s first building and the palace of the first Tibetan king, Nyatri Tsenpo. Later, it became the summer palace of Songtsen Gampo and his wife Princess Wencheng before it was turned into a Gelug monastery under the 5th Dalai Lama. The Yumbu Lakhang was heavily damaged and reduced to a single storey during the Cultural Revolution but was reconstructed in 1983.
- Tradruk Temple, either the first or second of the great geomantic temples of Tibet, was built during the reign of King Songtsen Gampo. Also known as Changzhu Monastery, is one of the earliest geomantic temples in the Yarlung Valley, possibly predating the Jokhang in Lhasa.
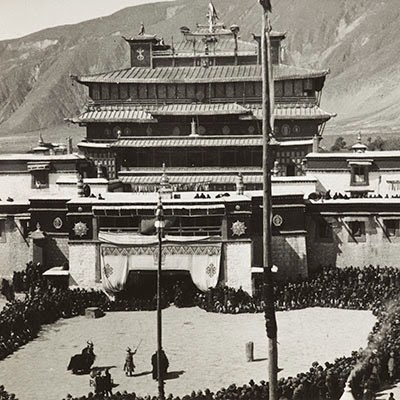
  Samye, photographed in 1936 by Hugh Edward Richardson, before its destruction during the Cultural Revolution.
- Samye Monastery, also called Samye Mighur Lhundrub Tsula Khang, is the first Tibetan Buddhist and Nyingma monastery, established under King Trisong Deutsen. Construction began around 763 by Shantarakshita, with Guru Padmasambhava completing it in 779, and it became the site of Tibet’s first monk ordinations. Though it was destroyed during the Cultural Revolution, it was rebuilt after 1988.
- Mindrolling Monastery, meaning “Place of Perfect Emancipation,” is one of the Six Mother Monasteries of the Nyingma school in Tibet. Founded by Rigzin Terdak Lingpa in 1676.
- Mount Sotang Kangbori (Tibetan: ཟོ་དང་གངས་པོ་རི།, ZWPY: Sotang Kangbori; or Sodang Gangpo Ri) is to the east of the town of Zêtang, rising 800 metres above the town with its spurs protecting it from the elements and forming a defensible position at the mouth of the valley. It is one of the four sacred mountains of Central Tibet, and the abode of Yarlha Shampo, a powerful mountain god. It is also famous for its cave at 4,060 metres (13,320 ft) near the summit. This is where, according to legend, Chenrezig (Avalokitesvara) incarnated as a red monkey and impregnated a sinmo, or white ogress, conceiving six sons who were the ancestors of the original six clans of Tibet. In the cave may be seen a naturally occurring image of a monkey and paintings of simian figures. It is said that within the mountain is a beyul or 'hidden land'.
- Sheldrak Monastery: Above the village of Sekhang Zhika, bypassing a sacred burial ground with a stupa dedicated to Hayagriva (Buddhism), is Sheldrak Monastery. Founded in the 14th century, it is apparently dedicated to the Terton or treasure-finder Sangye Lingpa. It contains images of Padmasambhava with his two foremost consorts, the Eight Manifestations of Padmasambhava, and Karmapa Rangjung Dorje (1284–1339 CE).
- The Sheldrak Caves in the Pema Tskeri range at the entrance to the Yarlung Valley above Sheldrak Monastery:

- Sheldrak Drubpuk (Shel brag) faces east and was Guru Rinpoche or Padmasambhava's first meditation cave in Tibet, where indigenous forces and demons were compelled to take an oath of allegiance to Buddhism. It is one of the most revered pilgrimage destinations on the Tibetan plateau and symbolizes the Buddha attributes of Padmasambhava. Originally there was a "speaking" image of Padmasambhava, but this has now been moved to Traduk Monastery. The altar now has new images of Guru Rinpoche with his two main consorts and the rock west wall has images of Avalokiteshvara, the 25 disciples of Padmasambhava, Boudhanath Stupa near Kathmandu and a crescent moon.
- Tsogyel Sangpuk (mTsho rgyal gsang phug) faces northeast and is the secret meditation cave of Yeshe Tsogyal, Padmasmabhava's consort. Its location is indicated by a prayer flag to the south of the cave.
- Pema Shelpuk or Padma Shepuk (Padma shel phug or yar-(k)lung shel-gyi brag-phag - 'Crystal Cave/Rock') faces west. This is where the famous Orgyen Lingpa (1323-circa 1360) discovered the terma Pema Katang (The Life and Liberation of Padmasambhava) and many other important works. It is a vital Nyingma site.

- Lhabab Ri (Lha bab ri) - 'The Hill of Divine Descent' is the highest of three hilltops at the southern end of the Pema Tsekpa range, below the Sheldrak Caves. It is where the first king, Nyatri Tsenpo is said to have descended from the heavens on a "sky-cord" (which the Bonpos believed connected heaven and earth) and, being unable to understand the local speech, was carried down the hill on the shoulders of Tibetans who realised his divine provenance and why he had come. Buddhist legends say he was descended from a Licchavi state in modern Bihar, and that he was descended from the Buddha.
- Tsechu Bumpa Stupa (Tse chu 'bum pa) is just south of the turnoff to Sheldrak. It is one of the three sacred stupas of Yarlung and its circumambulation usually marks the beginning or end of a pilgrimage to Sheldrak. It is said to have at its centre a rock crystal image of the Buddha brought from India and given by the translator Chokrolui Gyeltsen to King Trisong Detsen. Another legend says it contains the armour of King Songtsen Gampo. The site also contains a large number of mani stones.
- Gongtang Bumpa Stupa (dGon thang 'bum pa), one of the three main stupas of the Yarlung Valley, is situated at the centre of the entrance to the fertile Chongye Valley, protecting the Yarlung Valley from the approach of demons or hostile forces. It is said to have been built on the advice of the famous translator Vairocana, one of Padmasambhava's foremost students and holder of the Dzogchen lineage, to settle a boundary dispute. It was about 6–8 metres high. A new temple to the west has images of Hyagriva with Padmasambhava and Lhodrak Longka Geling on either side.
- Bairo Puk (Bairo phug) - Vairocana's Cave. The meditation cave of Vairocana, one of Padmasambhava's main disciples, is three metres deep facing a dry waterfall. Only the copper base of the original statue remains, though the imprint of Vairocana's hand in the rock and some rock-inscriptions remain.
- Riwo Choling Monastery. South of Tradruk Temple and east of Tsharu village are immense ruins of what was once a Gelugpa monastery founded in the 15th century by Panchen Lama I, Khedrup Gelek Pelzang (1385–1438), Je Tsongkhapa’s foremost disciple. The monks from here once acted as caretakers of the Yumbu Lagang Palace.

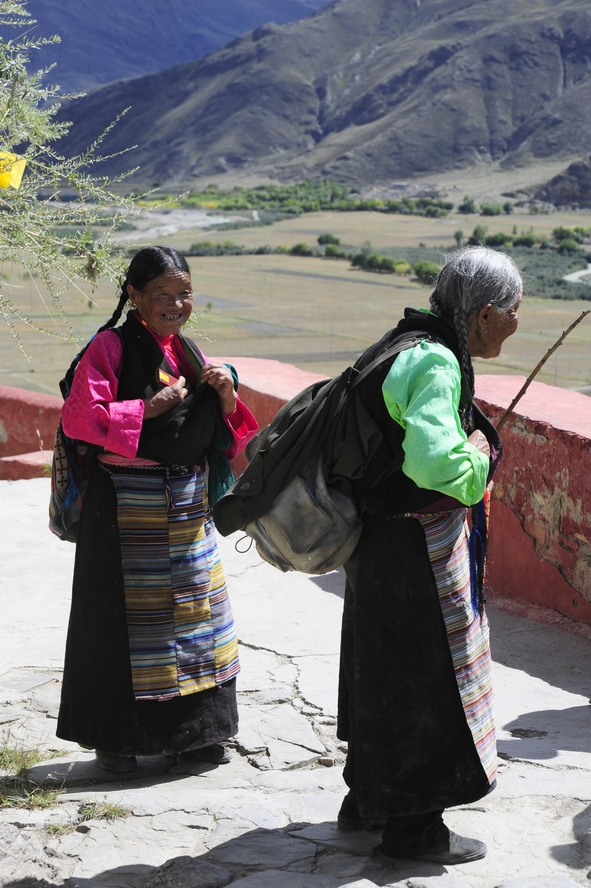
Elderly Tibetan women at Ombu Lhakang in the Yarlung Valley

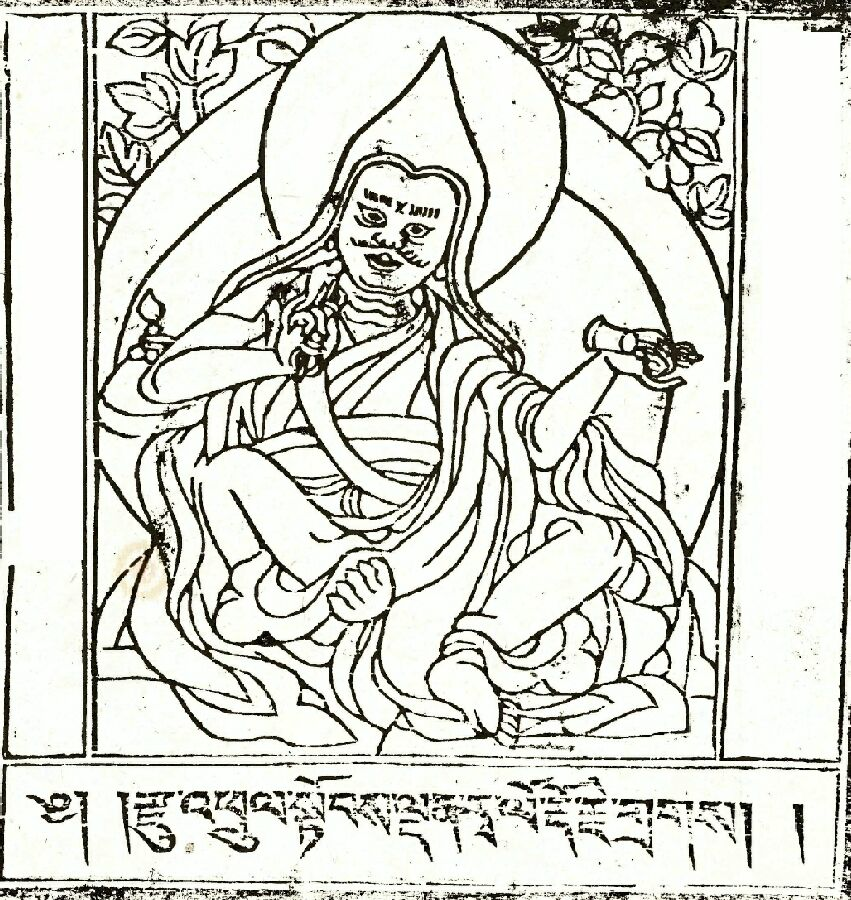
Ra Lotsāwa

- Podrang Village (Chogyel Potang; Chos rgyal pho brang), about 5 km south of Yumbu Lagang, is said to be the oldest village in Tibet.
- Takchen Bumpa Stupa (rTag spyan bum pa), is the first of the three major stupas of Yarlung. It is named after Sadaparudita (Tib. Taktu Ngu), a bodhisattva mentioned in the Prajnaparamita literature. It is on a pass on the old route to Eyul to the east. The chorten is of a very ancient design, with a dome-shaped bumpa (vase) and steps leading up to a window near the top of the dome. A lamp is left burning in the window. The structure was badly damaged during the Cultural Revolution but is now fully restored.
- Next to the Takchen Bumpa Stupa is Takchen Bumoche, a small Drukpa Kargyu monastery attributed to Geshe Korchen (12th century) from the Kadampa period. When Keith Dowman visited this monastery in 1985 or 1986 there were about a dozen monks in residence.
- Chode O has an Assembly Hall with three storeys. It was founded by the 5th Dalai Lama (1617–1682) and expanded by the 7th Dalai Lama (1708–1757). On the middle floor is the main image of Shakyamuni with his main disciples, Sixteen Elders and Eight Medicine Buddhas.
- Chode Gong is older than Chode O, being founded in the 11th century by Ra Lotsawa. The Temple is of four storeys and contains an Assembly Hall and an inner sanctum containing a shrine dedicated to Tsongkhapa and his students, the 8th Dalai Lama, the Buddhas of the Three Times and the Eight Bodhisattvas.
- Yabzang Monastery, presently mainly in ruins, was founded by Gyurme Long in 1206 was the seat of the small Yabzang Kagyu school tracing its descent through his teacher Geden Yeshe Chenye who was a disciple of Phakmodrupa.
- The main peak of Mount Yarlha Shampo is 24 km past Yarto township. The highest peak (6,636 m or 21,772 ft) is the abode of the protector Yarlha Shampo. The road leads over the Yarto Drak La pass (4,970 m or 15,715 ft), which marks the end of the Yarlung Valley, to the Nyel Valley and on to the Indian and Bhutanese borders.

== See also ==
- List of Tibetan monasteries
- Valley of the Kings (Tibet)
