= Tsetang =

Tsetang རྩེ་ཐང་གྲོང་རྡལ། · 泽当镇
- Town
- Zêtang Chongdä
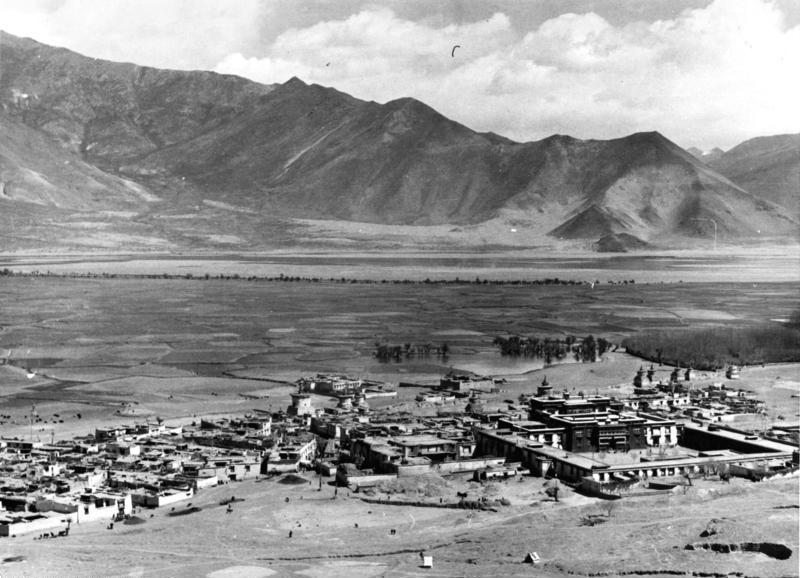

- Location within Tibet
- Coordinates: 29°15′N 91°46′E
- Country: People's Republic of China
- Province: Tibet Autonomous Region
- Prefecture-level city: Shannan
- District: Nedong

Population (2007)
  - Total: approximately 15,200
- Time zone: UTC+8 (CST)

Tsetang

Chinese name
- Simplified Chinese: 泽当
- Traditional Chinese: 澤當
Transcriptions
Standard Mandarin
- Hanyu Pinyin: Zédāng

Tibetan name
- Tibetan: རྩེ་ཐང།
Transcriptions
- Wylie: rtse thang
- Tibetan Pinyin: Zêtang

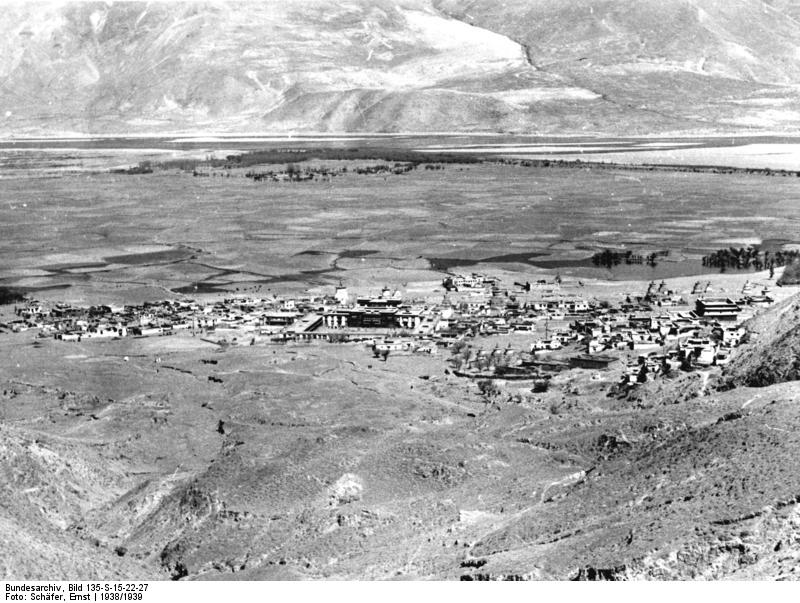
Tsetang, Tibet about 1938

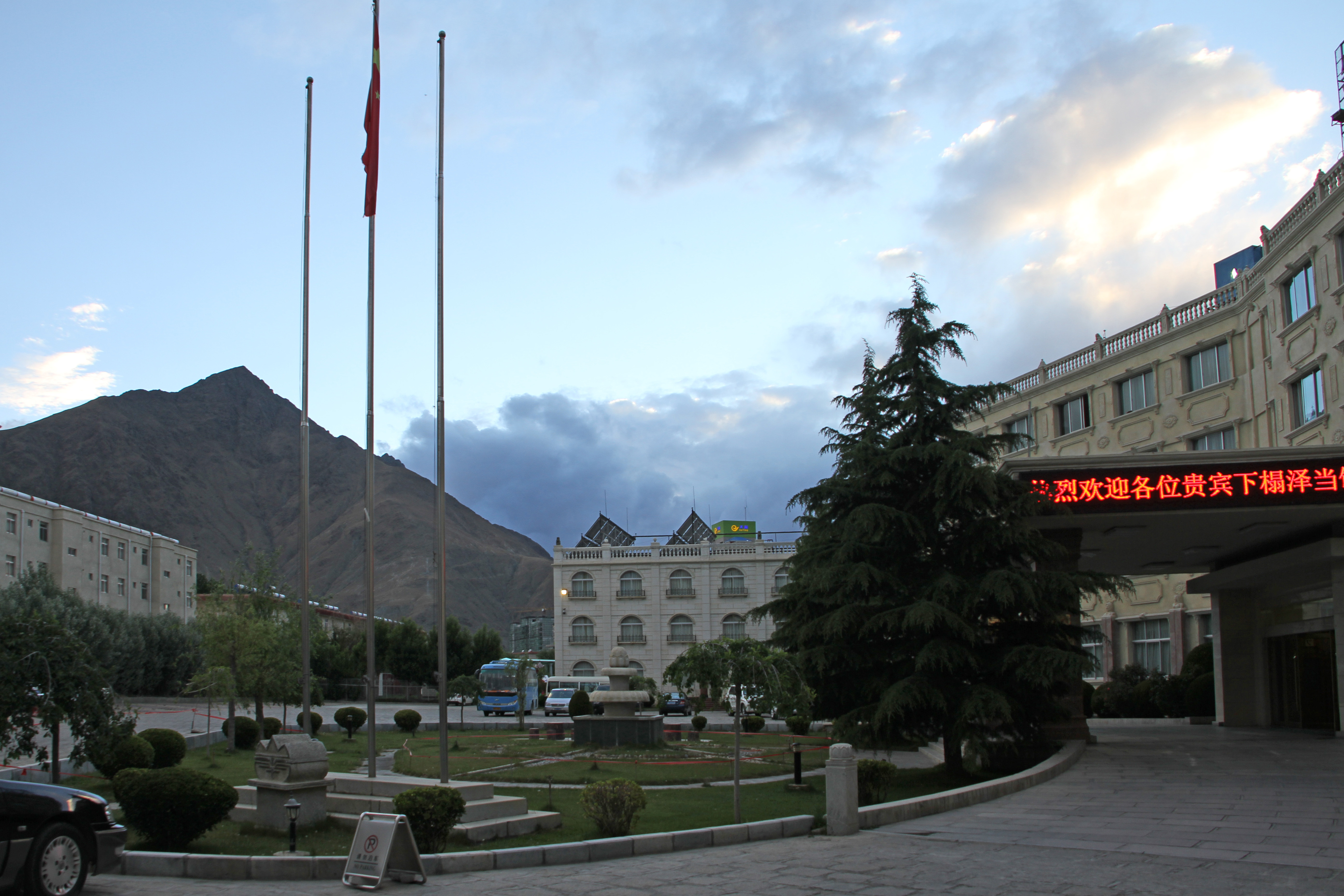
Hotel in Tsetang 2014

Tsetang (Tibetan: རྩེད་ཐང, Wylie: rtsed thang, THL: tsé tang) (Note: Alternative English spellings: Tsethang, Chethang and Chetang.) or Zedang (Chinese: 泽当镇; pinyin: Zé dāng zhèn), (Note: Alternative Chinese spellings: Zêtang and Zetang.) is the fourth largest city in Tibet and is located in the Yarlung Valley, 183 km (114 mi) southeast of Lhasa in Nedong District of the Shannan Prefecture in the Tibet region of China. It is the capital of Shannan Prefecture (which is also referred to as "Shannan City").

Tsetang has been the capital of the Yarlung region since antiquity and was the seat of the ancient emperors of Tibet and, as such, a place of great importance. In the 19th century, it is said to have comprised some 1,000 houses, a bazaar, a gompa and a fort.

As the capital of Shannan, it is the second-largest settlement in the historical Ü-Tsang region. It lies at an elevation of 3,100 m (10,200 ft) above sea level and has a population of approximately 52,000 persons. It is only about 4 km (2.5 mi) to the northeast of the town of Nedong and they have now essentially merged into one city.

Tsetang is situated near the flank of Mount Gongbori (3,400 m (11,200 ft)) where many ancient ruins (such as ruins of Gajiu Monastery) are located. It is known as the cradle of Tibetan's civilization. Samye, Tibet's first monastery, is located only 30 km (19 mi) from Tsetang and was founded in 779 CE by King Trisong Detsen.

The 14th century monastery of Tsetang, Ganden Chökhorling, was originally Kagyupa but was taken over by the Gelugpas in the 18th century. It was destroyed during the Cultural Revolution in the 1960s but has been restored since. Ngamchö is also a Gelugpa monastery and contains the bed and throne of the Dalai Lama and has a chapel devoted to medicine. The Samten Ling and Drebuling monasteries of the Sakyas still remained in 1959 but have since been destroyed and mostly built over. There is, however, the reconstructed Gelugpa Sang-ngag Zimche Nunnery, in the ruins of Samten Ling with a 1000-armed statue of Chenresig (Avalokiteshvara) said to have been made by Emperor Songtsen Gampo (605 or 617? - 649 CE).

The town supposedly dates back to the founding of the Tsetang Gompa in 1351 which became an important centre of learning.

One of three caves in the mountainside to the east of the town is said to be the birthplace of the Tibetan people who resulted from the mating of a monkey and a beautiful cannibal ogress.

About 5 km (3.1 mi) south of Tsetang is Changzhug Monastery founded during the reign of Songtsen Gampo and about 10 km (6.2 mi) further is Yumbulagang which, according to legend, was built as a palace for the first king, Nyatri Tsenpo, and was the first building in Tibet.

There are several hotels and a guesthouse in Tsetang.

== Climate ==
Tsetang has a cold semi-arid climate (Köppen climate classification BSk). The average annual temperature in Haidian is 9.2 °C (48.6 °F). The average annual rainfall is 384.7 mm (15.15 in) with July as the wettest month. The temperatures are highest on average in June, at around 16.5 °C (61.7 °F), and lowest in January, at around 0.4 °C (32.7 °F).

Climate data for Tsetang (1981–2010 normals, extremes 1981–2010)
Month	Jan	Feb	Mar	Apr	May	Jun	Jul	Aug	Sep	Oct	Nov	Dec	Year
Record high °C (°F)	20.5 (68.9)	20.6 (69.1)	25.0 (77.0)	26.5 (79.7)	28.7 (83.7)	30.0 (86.0)	30.3 (86.5)	28.5 (83.3)	27.1 (80.8)	24.5 (76.1)	22.5 (72.5)	19.3 (66.7)	30.3 (86.5)
Mean daily maximum °C (°F)	8.9 (48.0)	10.5 (50.9)	13.9 (57.0)	16.8 (62.2)	20.6 (69.1)	24.0 (75.2)	23.4 (74.1)	22.6 (72.7)	21.2 (70.2)	18.2 (64.8)	13.2 (55.8)	9.7 (49.5)	16.9 (62.5)
Daily mean °C (°F)	0.4 (32.7)	2.8 (37.0)	6.4 (43.5)	9.2 (48.6)	13.0 (55.4)	16.5 (61.7)	16.4 (61.5)	15.7 (60.3)	14.2 (57.6)	10.2 (50.4)	4.5 (40.1)	0.6 (33.1)	9.2 (48.5)
Mean daily minimum °C (°F)	−7.3 (18.9)	−4.6 (23.7)	−0.7 (30.7)	2.5 (36.5)	6.3 (43.3)	10.3 (50.5)	11.3 (52.3)	10.9 (51.6)	9.0 (48.2)	3.5 (38.3)	−2.7 (27.1)	−6.7 (19.9)	2.7 (36.8)
Record low °C (°F)	−18.2 (−0.8)	−13.3 (8.1)	−10.1 (13.8)	−6.8 (19.8)	−2.6 (27.3)	0.7 (33.3)	5.8 (42.4)	4.5 (40.1)	−0.7 (30.7)	−6.1 (21.0)	−11.2 (11.8)	−14.8 (5.4)	−18.2 (−0.8)
Average precipitation mm (inches)	0.3 (0.01)	1.1 (0.04)	5.6 (0.22)	12.6 (0.50)	26.7 (1.05)	48.7 (1.92)	113.3 (4.46)	110.8 (4.36)	56.0 (2.20)	8.4 (0.33)	1.0 (0.04)	0.2 (0.01)	384.7 (15.14)
Average precipitation days (≥ 0.1 mm)	0.5	1.2	3.1	6.4	9.3	13.5	19.9	18.6	12.4	3.3	0.7	0.3	89.2
Average snowy days	1.4	2.6	6.3	5.2	1.0	0	0	0	0	1.0	1.4	0.6	19.5
Average relative humidity (%)	29	28	31	39	43	49	60	61	58	43	34	32	42
Mean monthly sunshine hours	230.2	220.5	250.8	255.9	269.9	248.3	213.8	223.0	231.7	264.2	244.3	237.8	2,890.4
Percentage possible sunshine	71	69	67	66	64	59	50	55	63	75	77	75	66
Source: China Meteorological Administration (precipitation days, snow days, sunshine 1991–2011)
