= Nedong, Shannan =

Nêdong 乃东区 • སྣེ་གདོང་ཆུས།
- District
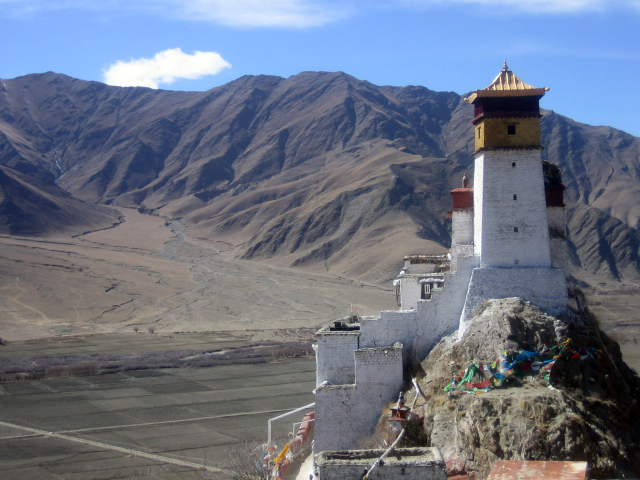
- Yumbu Lhakhang, the first palace of Tibet

- Location in Tibet Nêdong (China)
- Coordinates: 29°13′12″N 91°46′48″E
- Country: China
- Autonomous region: Tibet
- Prefecture-level city: Shannan (Lhoka)
- District seat: Tsetang Subdistrict

Area
  - Total: 2,184.98 km^{2} (843.63 sq mi)

Population (2020)
  - Total: 81,608
  - Density: 37.350/km^{2} (96.735/sq mi)
- Time zone: UTC+08:00 (China Standard)
- Website: www.naidong.gov.cn

Nedong, Shannan

Chinese name
- Simplified Chinese: 乃东区
- Traditional Chinese: 乃東區
Transcriptions
Standard Mandarin
- Hanyu Pinyin: Nǎidōng Qū

Tibetan name
- Tibetan: སྣེ་གདོང་ཆུས།
Transcriptions
- Wylie: sne gdong chus
- Tibetan Pinyin: Nêdong Qü

Nêdong District (Tibetan: སྣེ་གདོང་ཆུས།; Chinese: 乃东区) is a district of Shannan in the Tibet Autonomous Region, China. Nêdong District has a storied administrative history rooted in its strategic location along the Yarlung River.

Tradruk Temple, an important early Buddhist monastery dating to the reign of Songtsen Gampo, is located in the Yarlung Valley in Nêdong as is Yungbulakang Palace.

== History ==
Originally part of the ancient Tibetan Empire, it served as a key administrative center during the 7th–9th centuries CE, with Yumbu Lakhang Palace symbolizing its royal legacy.

During the Yuan Dynasty (1271–1368), the area was incorporated into the Central Government's governance as part of the Ü-Tsang region. In the Ming (1368–1644) and Qing (1644–1912) periods, Nêdong evolved into a county-level entity, overseeing local affairs and serving as a cultural nexus. In 1959, Naedong County was established under the jurisdiction of the Shannan Special Administrative Region. In 1970, the Shannan Special Administrative Region was renamed Shannan Prefecture. In February 2016, the State Council approved the abolition of Shannan Prefecture and Nedong County, establishing Shannan City at the prefectural level and Nedong District under Shannan City.

== Administrative divisions ==
Nêdong District contains 1 subdistrict, 1 town and 5 townships.

Name	Chinese	Hanyu Pinyin	Tibetan	Wylie
Subdistrict
Tsetang Subdistrict	泽当街道	Zédāng Jiēdào	རྩེད་ཐང་ཁྲོམ་ལམ་།	rtsed thang khrom lam
Town
Thradrug Town	昌珠镇	Chāngzhū zhèn	ཁྲ་འབྲུག་གྲོང་རྡལ།	khra 'brug grong rdal
Townships
Yadoi Township	亚堆乡	Yàduī xiāng	ཡ་སྟོད་ཤང་།	ya stod shang
Sodruk Township	索珠乡	Suǒzhū xiāng	སོ་དྲུག་ཤང་།	so drug shang
Dopozhang Township	多颇章乡	Duōpōzhāng xiāng	རྡོ་ཕོ་བྲང་ཤང་།	sdo pho brang shang
Kerpa Township	结巴乡	Jiébā xiāng	སྐར་པ་ཤང་།	skar pa shang
Pozhang Township	颇章乡	Pōzhāng xiāng	པོ་བྲང་ཤང་།	pho brang shang

== Climate ==
Climate data for Shannan (Nedong District), elevation 3,560 m (11,680 ft), (1991–2020 normals, extremes 1981–2010)
Month	Jan	Feb	Mar	Apr	May	Jun	Jul	Aug	Sep	Oct	Nov	Dec	Year
Record high °C (°F)	20.5 (68.9)	20.6 (69.1)	25.0 (77.0)	26.5 (79.7)	28.7 (83.7)	30.0 (86.0)	30.3 (86.5)	28.5 (83.3)	27.1 (80.8)	24.5 (76.1)	22.5 (72.5)	19.3 (66.7)	30.3 (86.5)
Mean daily maximum °C (°F)	9.3 (48.7)	10.8 (51.4)	14.2 (57.6)	17.2 (63.0)	20.7 (69.3)	23.9 (75.0)	23.6 (74.5)	22.7 (72.9)	21.5 (70.7)	18.4 (65.1)	13.7 (56.7)	10.3 (50.5)	17.2 (63.0)
Daily mean °C (°F)	0.8 (33.4)	3.1 (37.6)	6.7 (44.1)	9.5 (49.1)	13.2 (55.8)	16.5 (61.7)	16.5 (61.7)	15.9 (60.6)	14.5 (58.1)	10.4 (50.7)	4.8 (40.6)	1.0 (33.8)	9.4 (48.9)
Mean daily minimum °C (°F)	−6.7 (19.9)	−4.2 (24.4)	−0.3 (31.5)	2.9 (37.2)	6.8 (44.2)	10.6 (51.1)	11.6 (52.9)	11.2 (52.2)	9.4 (48.9)	4.0 (39.2)	−2.1 (28.2)	−6.2 (20.8)	3.1 (37.5)
Record low °C (°F)	−18.2 (−0.8)	−13.3 (8.1)	−10.1 (13.8)	−6.8 (19.8)	−2.6 (27.3)	0.7 (33.3)	5.8 (42.4)	4.5 (40.1)	−0.7 (30.7)	−6.1 (21.0)	−11.2 (11.8)	−14.8 (5.4)	−18.2 (−0.8)
Average precipitation mm (inches)	0.6 (0.02)	1.5 (0.06)	4.9 (0.19)	14.4 (0.57)	30.0 (1.18)	52.4 (2.06)	122.4 (4.82)	113.0 (4.45)	53.7 (2.11)	8.5 (0.33)	1.2 (0.05)	0.5 (0.02)	403.1 (15.86)
Average precipitation days (≥ 0.1 mm)	0.5	1.2	3.1	6.4	9.3	13.5	19.9	18.6	12.4	3.3	0.7	0.3	89.2
Average snowy days	1.4	2.6	6.3	5.2	1.0	0	0	0	0	1.0	1.4	0.6	19.5
Average relative humidity (%)	28	27	32	40	44	51	61	62	58	44	33	31	43
Mean monthly sunshine hours	230.2	220.5	250.8	255.9	269.9	248.3	213.8	223.0	231.7	264.2	244.3	237.8	2,890.4
Percentage possible sunshine	71	69	67	66	64	59	50	55	63	75	77	75	66
Source: China Meteorological Administration

== Gallery ==
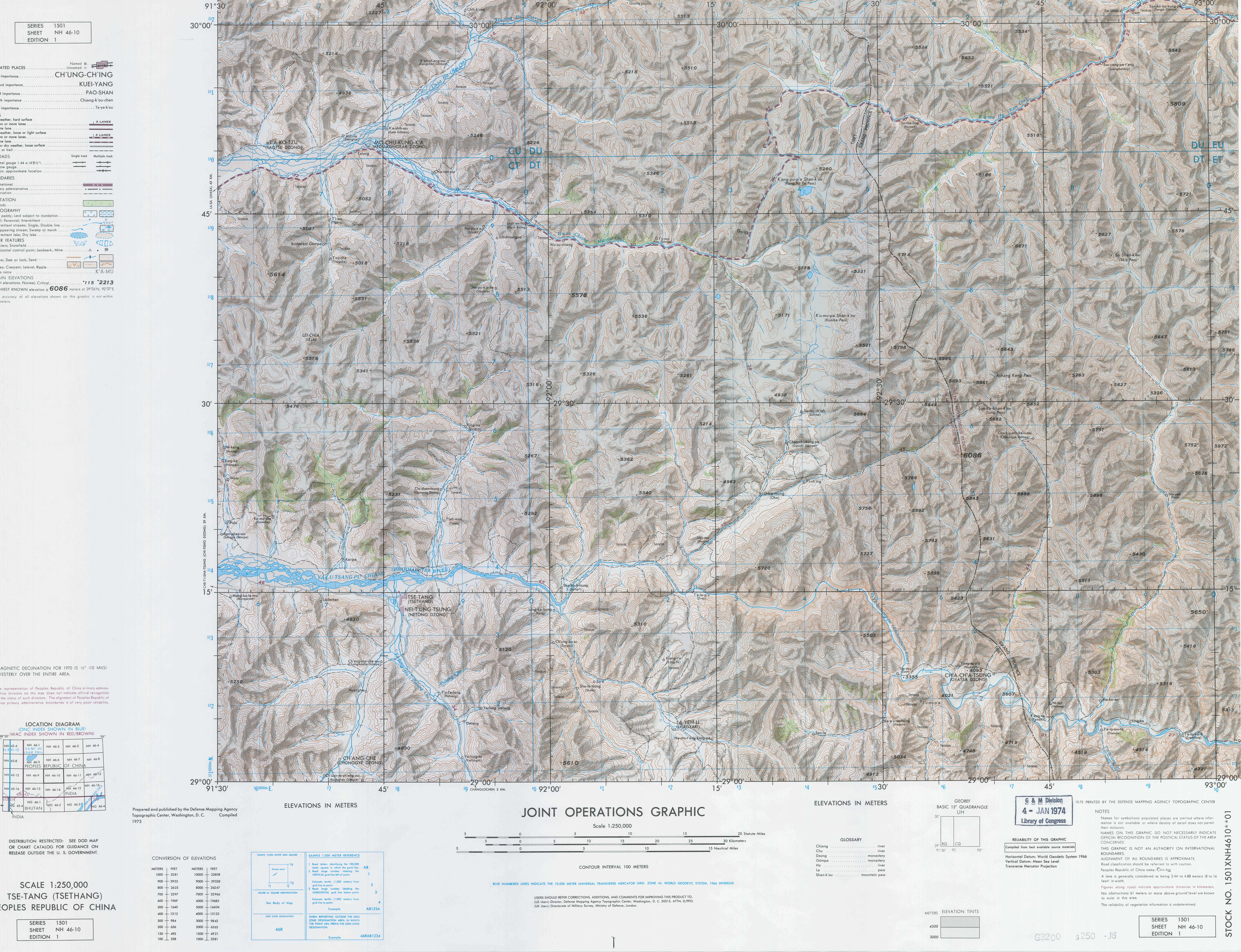

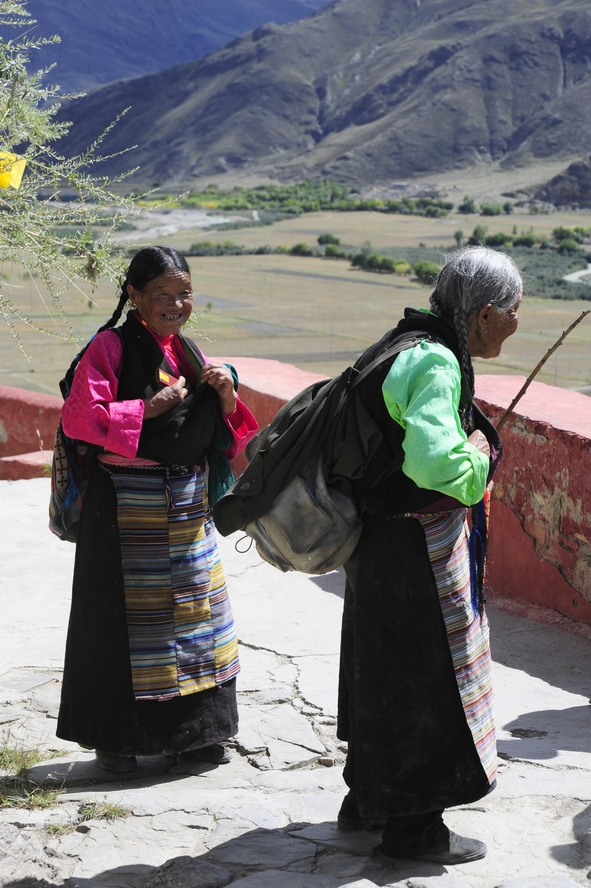
