= Lhozhag County =

Lhozhag County 洛扎县 • ལྷོ་བྲག་རྫོང་།
- County
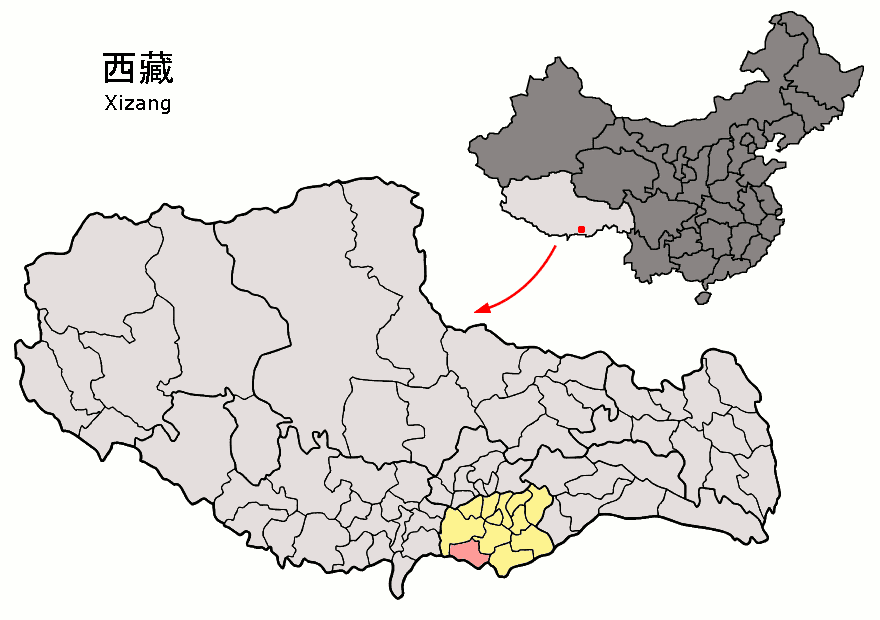
- Location of Lhozhag County (red) within Shannan City (yellow) and Tibet

- Location of the seat in Tibet Lhozhag (China)
- Coordinates: 28°23′46″N 91°07′50″E
- Country: China
- Autonomous region: Tibet
- Prefecture-level city: Shannan (Lhoka)
- County seat: Lhozhag

Area
  - Total: 5,022.73 km^{2} (1,939.29 sq mi)

Population (2020)
  - Total: 19,865
  - Density: 3.9550/km^{2} (10.243/sq mi)
- Time zone: UTC+8 (China Standard)
- Website: www.luozha.gov.cn

Lhozhag County

Chinese name
- Simplified Chinese: 洛扎县
- Traditional Chinese: 洛扎縣
Transcriptions
Standard Mandarin
- Hanyu Pinyin: Luòzhā Xiàn

Tibetan name
- Tibetan: ལྷོ་བྲག་རྫོང་།
Transcriptions
- Wylie: lho brag rdzong
- Tibetan Pinyin: Lhozhag Zong

Lhozhag County (Tibetan: ལྷོ་བྲག་རྫོང་།; Chinese: 洛扎县) is a county of Shannan located in the south-east of the Tibet Autonomous Region, China.

== Geography ==
Lhozhag Nub Qu (ལྷོ་བྲག་ནུབ་ཆུ་; 洛扎怒曲) is situated in Lhozhag County.

== Administrative divisions ==
Lhozhag County contains 2 towns and 5 townships.

Name	Chinese	Hanyu Pinyin	Tibetan	Wylie
Towns
Lhozhag Town	洛扎镇	Luòzhā zhèn	ལྷོ་བྲག་གྲོང་རྡལ།	lho brag grong rdal
Lhakang Town	拉康镇	Lākāng zhèn	ལྷ་ཁང་གྲོང་རྡལ།	lha khang grong rdal
Townships
Zara Township	扎日乡	Zhārì xiāng	རྫ་ར་ཤང་།	rdza ra shang
Se Township	色乡	Sè xiāng	སྲས་ཤང་།	sras shang
Sengge Township	生格乡	Shēnggé xiāng	སེང་གེ་ཤང་།	seng ge shang
Benpa Township	边巴乡	Biānbā xiāng	བེན་པ་ཤང་།	ben pa shang
La'gyab Township	拉郊乡	Lājiāo xiāng	ལ་རྒྱབ་ཤང་།	la ryab shang
