= Ongkor Festival =

Festival

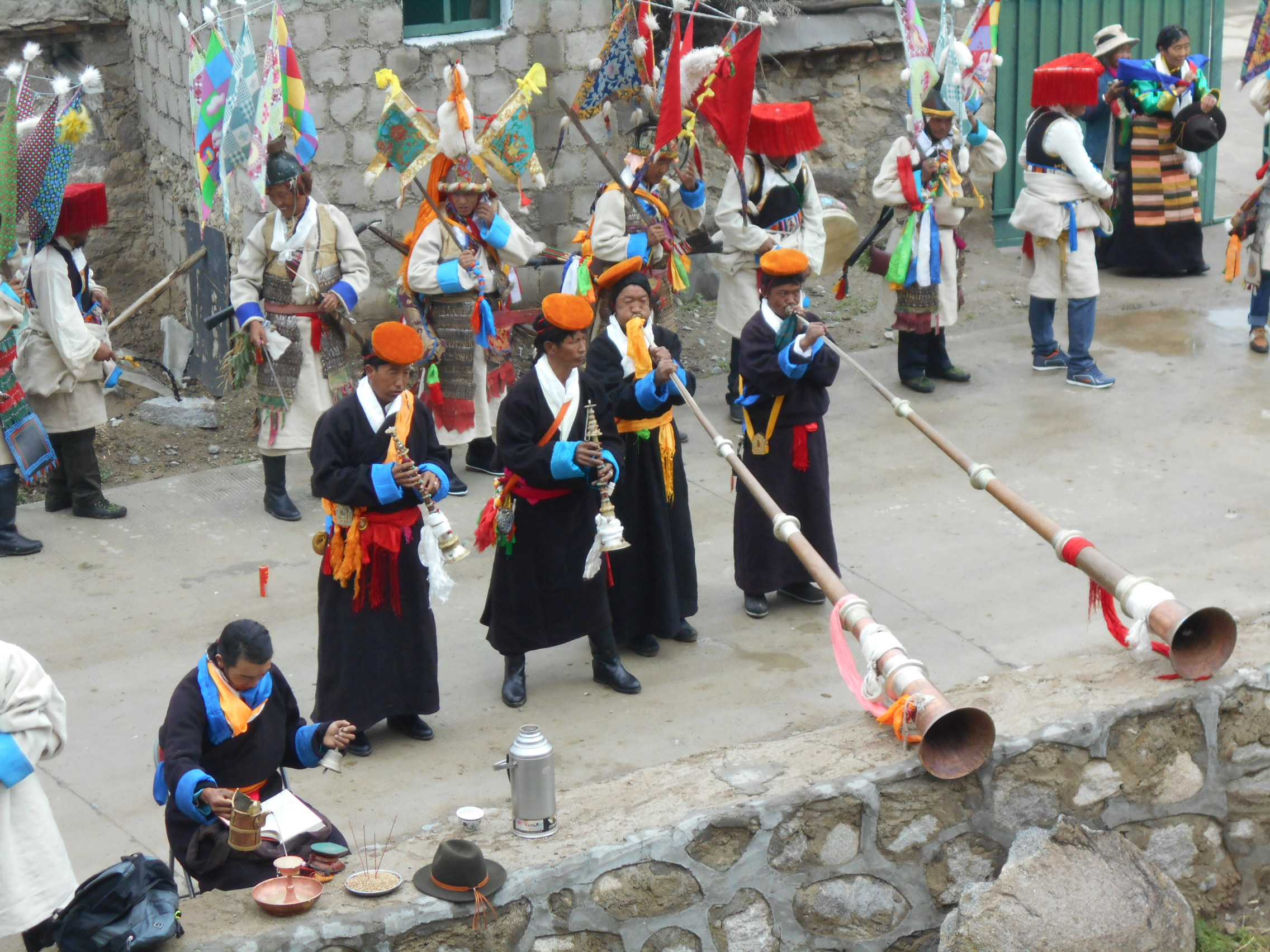
Monks playing the Tibetan horn during the Tibetan summer festival Ongkor, 2016

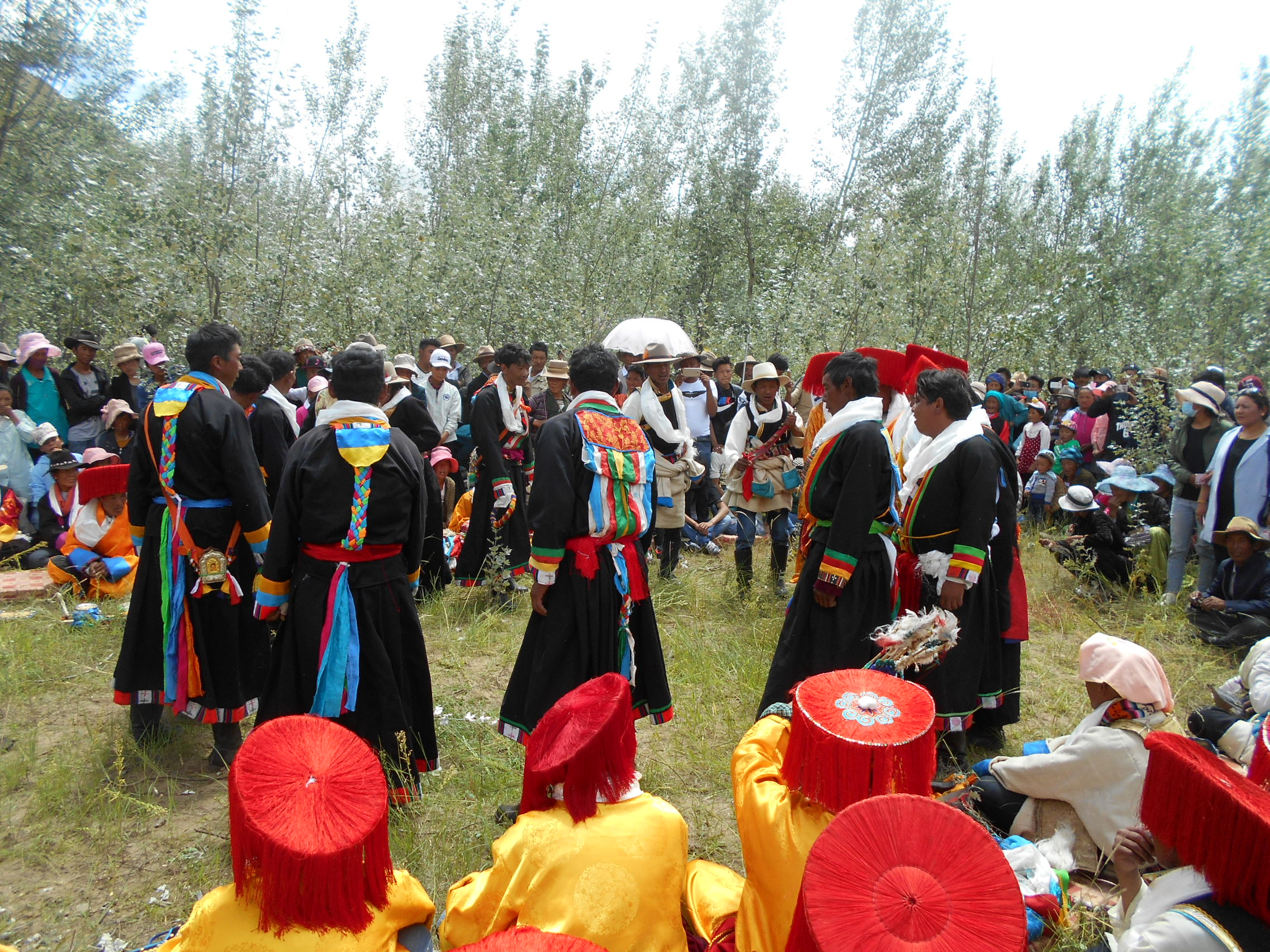
Traditional Tibetan dancing in fields during the Ongkor summer festival, 2016

The Ongkor Festival (Standard Tibetan: འོང་སྐོར་, 'ong skor, or Serkor (སེར་སྐོར་) in some dialects) is one of the most important Tibetan festivals of the Tibetan lunar year. Ongkor is usually held at the end of summer. It is a national intangible cultural heritage, popular in Lhasa, Shigatse, Shannan and other places in Tibet.

== Activities ==
The meaning of the festival's name is "good wishes for harvest", literally "making a circle around the field". During this festival, one person from each family in the village participates in kora in the fields. People in the procession dress in traditional clothes and play different roles—warriors, riders, drummers, those praying, or monks. In some regions Tibetan opera, dancing to drums and horse racing is performed. During this festival, many different aspects of traditional Tibetan culture are shown, including singing, dancing, the art of debate, and praying.

Recently the festival has been known as the Horse Race Festival, due to travel agencies who want to attract tourists.
