= Gajiu Monastery =

Monastery in Tibet, China

Gajiu Monastery is an ancient Buddhist temple located near the old Tibetan village of Tsetang in the province of Tibet. Only ruins remain of the temple which was built at the foot of Mount Gongbori.
