= Shannan, Tibet =

Shannan 山南市 · ལྷོ་ཁ་གྲོང་ཁྱེར།
- Prefecture-level city
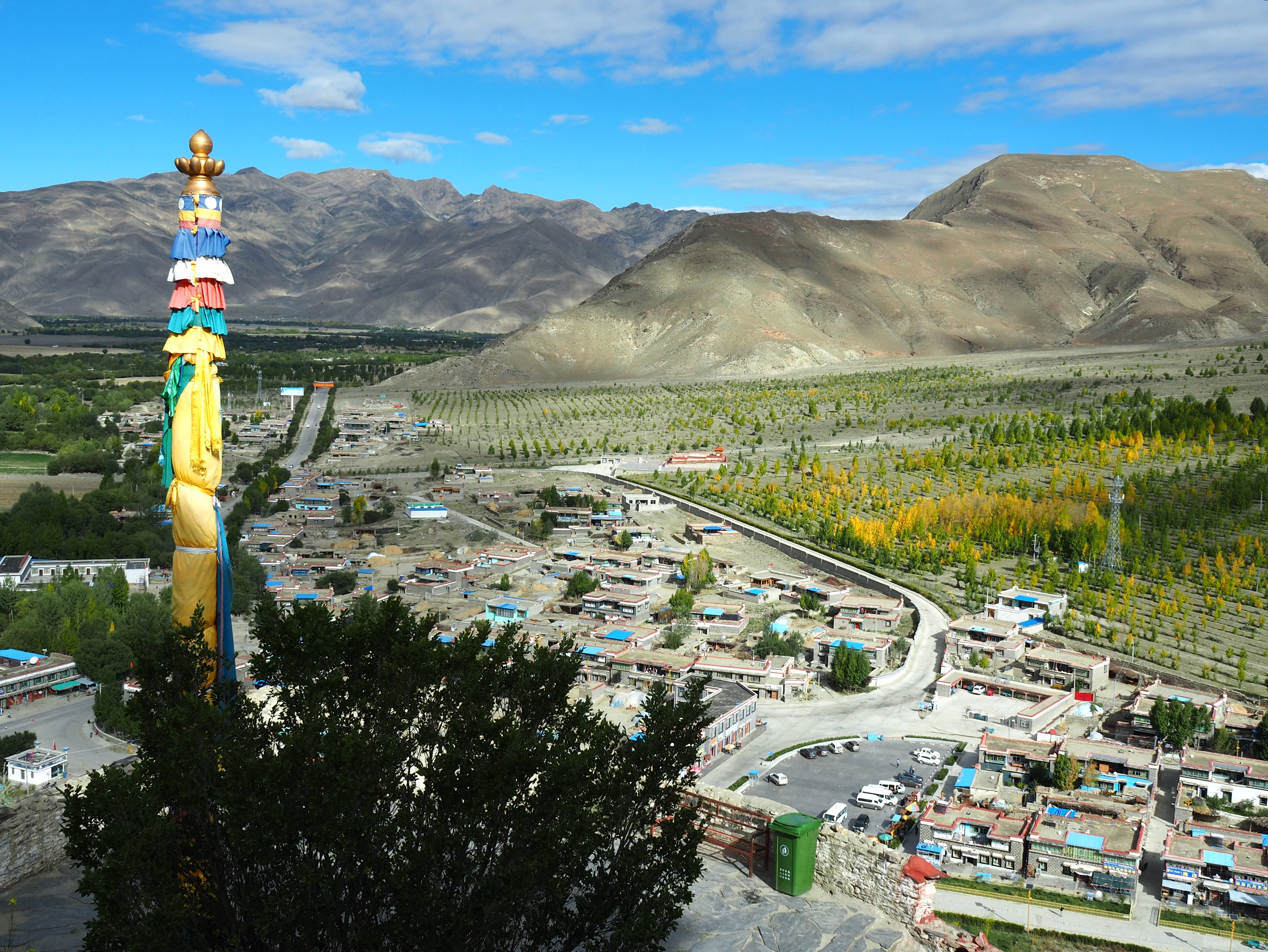

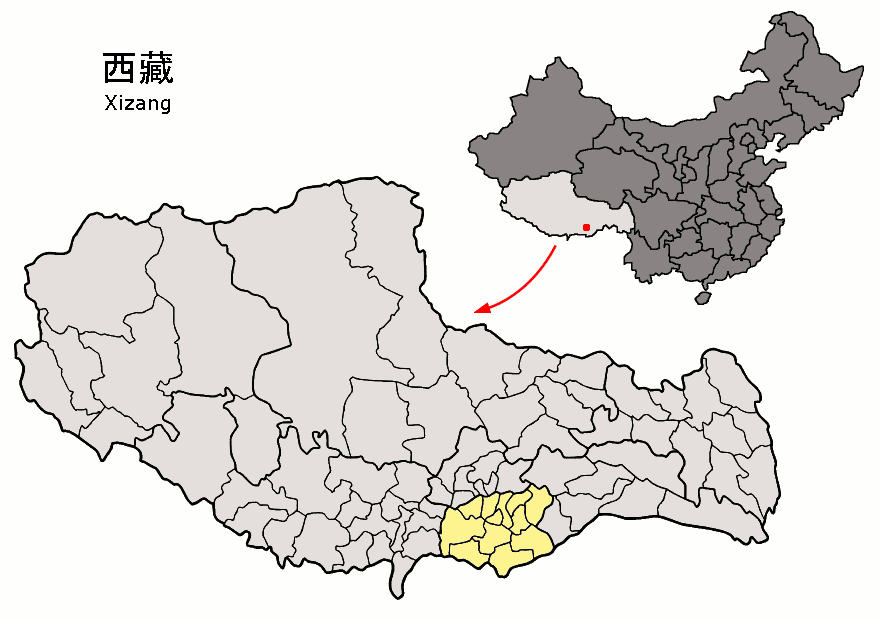
- Location of Shannan Prefecture within China
- Coordinates (Shannan prefectural government): 29°14′17″N 91°46′16″E
- Country: China
- Autonomous region: Tibet
- Seat: Nêdong District (Zêtang)

Area
  - Total: 79,700 km^{2} (30,800 sq mi)

Population (2020)
  - Total: 354,035
  - Density: 4.44/km^{2} (11.5/sq mi)

GDP
  - Total: CN¥ 18.8 billion US$ 2.7 billion
  - Per capita: CN¥ 49,556; US$ 7,171
- ISO 3166 code: CN-XZ-05
- Website: http://www.shannan.gov.cn/

Shannan
- "Shannan" in Chinese and Tibetan characters

Chinese name
- Chinese: 山南
- Hanyu Pinyin: Shānnán
- Literal meaning: south of the mountains
Transcriptions
Standard Mandarin
- Hanyu Pinyin: Shānnán

Alternative Chinese name
- Chinese: 洛卡
- Hanyu Pinyin: Luòkǎ
Transcriptions
Standard Mandarin
- Hanyu Pinyin: Luòkǎ

Tibetan name
- Tibetan: ལྷོ་ཁ།
Transcriptions
- Wylie: lho kha
- Tibetan Pinyin: Lhoka

Shannan (Chinese: 山南; pinyin: Shānnán; lit. 'south of the mountains'), also known as Lhoka (Tibetan: ལྷོ་ཁ།, Wylie: lho kha, ZWPY: lhoka; Chinese: 洛卡; pinyin: Luò kǎ), is a prefecture-level city in the southeastern Tibet Autonomous Region, China. Shannan includes Gonggar County within its jurisdiction with Gongkar Chö Monastery, Gonggar Dzong, and Gonggar Airport all located near Gonggar town.

Located on the middle and lower reaches of the Yarlung Valley, formed by the Yarlung Tsangpo River, Lhoka region is often regarded as the birthplace of Tibetan civilization. It is bounded by the city of Lhasa to the north, Nyingchi to the east, Shigatse on the west and the international border with India and Bhutan on the south. The city measures 420 kilometres (260 mi) east to west and 329 kilometres (204 mi) from north to south. Its uniqueness stems from the fact that Tibet's earliest agricultural farmland, its first palace and first Buddhist monastery are all located in Lhoka. It also has the distinction of having held the first lhamo performance. Ethnic Tibetans constitute 98% of the population, the remaining 2% being Han, Hui, Mönpa, Lhoba and other ethnic groups.

Shannan has 1 district and 11 counties and its capital is Tsetang, which is located 183 kilometres from Lhasa. It covers an area of 79,700 square kilometres (30,800 mi^{2}), which includes part of South Tibet, a disputed territory currently under control of the Indian state of Arunachal Pradesh; the disputed parts include Itanagar, the state capital of Arunachal Pradesh. Its topography averages 3,700 metres (12,100 ft) above sea level. The population of Tsetang city was 330,100 as of 2007 with Tibetans accounting for 96% of the total population. The resident population of Shannan increased by 25,045 or 7.61% from 328,990 in the 2010 Sixth National Census to 354,035, with an average annual growth rate of 0.74%, in 2020. By the end of 2024, the city's resident population will be 357,500.

The Lhoka region has not only an ancient historical background but is also the most prosperous in Tibet.

== History ==
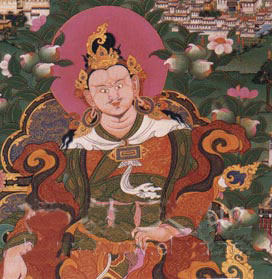
The first King, Nyatri Tsenpo

A legend that attests to the position of Lhoka region in the annals of Tibetan history states that human beings are the creation of a union between a sacred monkey and women. According to archaeological findings and legends and ancient documents, people lived in this area up to four million years ago. A primitive civilization grew up in the Yarlung Valley and a field in the village of Sare near Tsetang Town, is said to be the first farming field in Tibet. The first king in Tibetan history, Nyatri Tsenpo, really a mere chief of the Yarlong tribe, began ruling over the Yarlung valley in the beginning of second century BC. He founded the Fan Kingdom and established a hereditary monarchy. During the reign of the ninth king, Budegong, agriculture flourished and he was able to mobilize the people to excavate canal, channelling water to irrigate the flatland. A formal forming system came into existence during the reign of Yixiulie, the eleventh king, when he devised standard measurement units for allocating farmland and counting livestock. Six palaces were built in the region between the rule of the ninth and fifteenth kings.

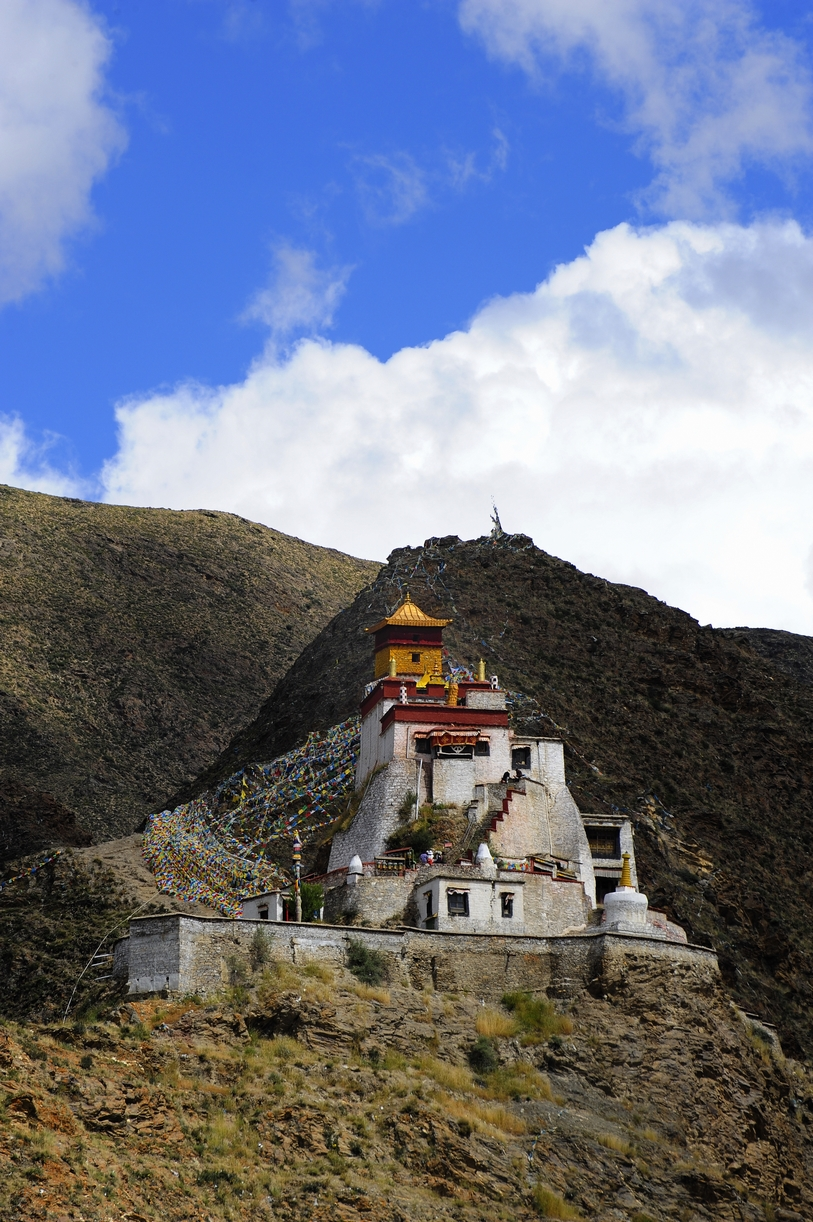
The ancient Yarlung Valley, Nêdong District, Lhoka

Around the 6th century AD, the Yarlung Valley became a society which smelted a variety of materials including iron, copper and silver to produce weapons and other objects. The 31st king of Yarlung, Namri Songtsen, was an expansionist and invaded neighbouring tribes, expanding the territory of Yarlung. The 33rd king (who was also the first emperor of Tibet), Songtsän Gampo, conquered Subi tribe, Yangtong tribe and many others and established the Tibetan Empire. Although transferred his capital city from Qiongjie to Lhasa, many of his descendant of the royal lineage still lived in the Lhoka region. He made Yungbulakang Palace his summer palace, which by this time was an important centre for Buddhism and the storage of Buddhist scriptures. In 641 AD, Gampo married Princess Wencheng of the Tang dynasty.

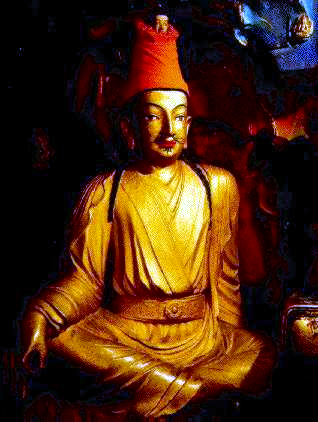
Songsten Gampo

During the Tibetan Empire, a great number of irrigation projects developed along the Yarlong River and the Yarlung Tsangpo River, and with the increase of yaks and horses here there was dramatic development in agriculture. However, continued conflict led to endless famine and eventually the collapse of the Tubo regime. In 1253, Möngke Khan, the emperor of the Yuan dynasty, invaded Tibet and united the squabbling tribes into an administrative region, controlled by the central government of the Yuan dynasty in Beijing. However, the dominant tribe in the Yarlung valley during this period was the Pazhu dynasty and in 1322, Qiangqujianqun became the leader of the Pazhu and replenished agricultural activity in the region, funding irrigation works, cultivating lands, reconstructing roads, restoring houses and developing husbandry. Qiangqujiangqun founded the Naidong dynasty which would last for 262 years, introduced the system of feudal serfdom and implemented a new government system with divisions known as Zong, established 13 of them in Nêdong (the capital), Gonggar and so forth.

On May 23, 1951, a Tibetan delegation signed the Seventeen Point Agreement with the central government of the People's Republic of China for the "peaceful liberation of Tibet". However, in 1959, the Lhoka was annexed to China by brute force. Many monasteries were destroyed during the invasion and the Yungbulakang Palace was severely damaged.

== Geography ==
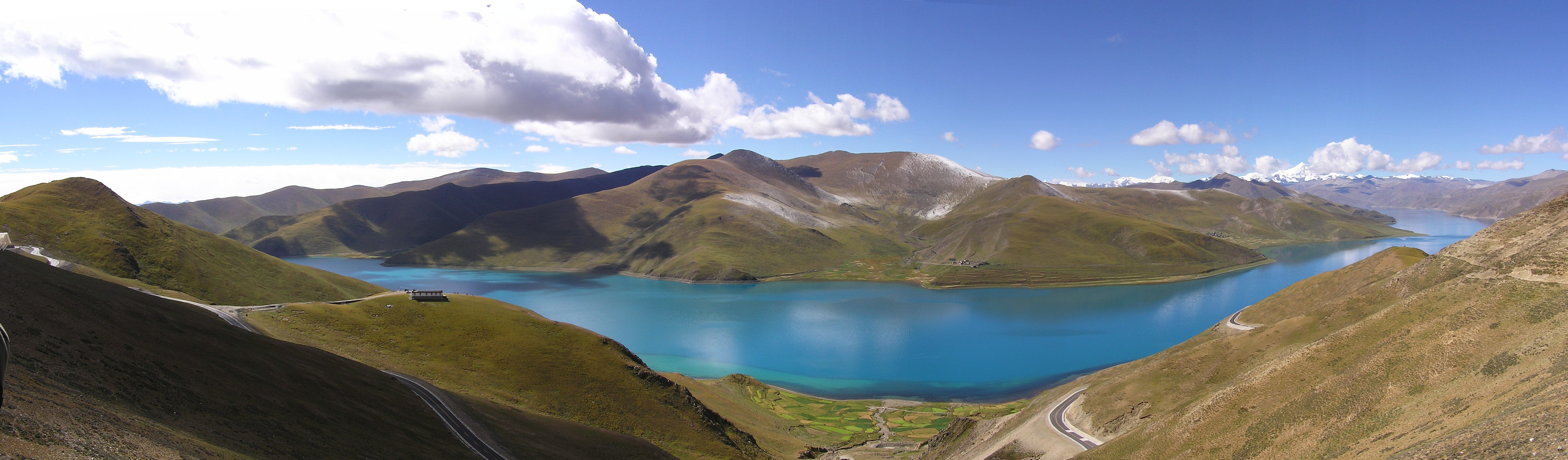
Yamdrok Yumtso Lake

Lhoka region forms one-fifteenth of the total area of the Tibet Autonomous Region. It comprises 12 counties, out of which the eight northern counties are the Nedong, Qusum, Qonggyai, Sangri, Comai, Zhanang, Gyacha and Cona in the middle valley of the Yarlung Zangbo, and the remaining four namely, the Gonggar, Lhunzi, Lohozhag and Nagarze are in the Himalayan belt. The Cona, Lhongzi, Nanggarze and Lhozha counties form the International Border. The city's district and counties have 144 townships of which 71 townships are in agricultural sector, 18 are in animal husbandry sector and the balance 55 are a mix of the two sectors. There are also five neighbourhood committees and 719 village committees. The wide Yarlung River flowing from west to east (between Quxu and Gyacha) also known as Tsongpo and the Brahmaputra River in India and Jamuna in Bangladesh, and its tributaries flows through the middle and lower stretches of the city and is bounded by Lhasa on the north, Nyingchi on the east, Shigatse to the west and international border that extends to 630 kilometres (390 mi) with India and Bhutan. The river system has provided large perennial source of water in the region of fertile land. The valley created by the river system has very green pasture land and thick forests.

The region is studded with hills, valleys, rivers, streams, lakes, hot springs, limestone (karst) caves and many natural scenic regions. The region is also credited with the first "cultivated lands, measured fields, water irrigation, storing the forage grass, moulding metal, and many other techniques".

The natural scenic regions of the city have been categorized under four types. The Yarlung State Scenic Region is one type which has the snow-covered mountains, glaciers, pastures, river valley, alpine vegetation and historical monuments and folk customs and art forms.

=== Hydrology ===
This river area is spread over parts of eight counties of Shannan. Yamzog Yumcog Scenic Region which has lakes, snow-covered mountains, islands, pasture land, hot springs, monasteries and many scenic places, Samyai Scenic Region which has many historical monuments in the counties of Samyi, Songa and Azar towns in the Zanang County and Sacred Lake Scenic Region which is covered by the Sangri, Qusum and Gyacha Counties, are part of this valley. The region has mountains, valleys, rivers, springs, historical architectural monuments and monasteries.

The city has rich water resources of the Yarlung Zangbo or Tsongpo as it is known in the short form. It is the mother river of Tibet. In addition, 41 other rivers flow through Lhoka. The river flowing from west to east has a river area of 38,300 square kilometres (14,800 mi^{2}) and flows for 424 kilometres (263 mi) through seven counties namely, Nanggarze, Gonggar, Chahang, Nedong, Sangri, Qusum and Gyacha. In addition, there are 88 lakes of which the important ones are the Yamdrok Lake, the Chigu Lake and the Purmo Yumco lake. The hydroelectric power potential of the river system of Shannan has been assessed at 35.1 million kW. However, the power generated at present is only 18,300 kW.

==== Divine lakes ====
===== Yamdrok Yumtso Lake =====
Yamdrok Yumtso Lake, appears like jasper in a dark blue colour and it is one of the four holy lakes in Tibet. Viewed from the top of the Gampala Pass (4,794 metres (15,728 ft)), the lake appears in the shape of a scorpion. It is located in Nhagartse County on the way to Gyantse and is 50 kilometres (31 mi) from Tsedang Yumtso. It is situated at an altitude of 4,480 metres (14,700 ft) and has a very large area of 638 square kilometres (246 mi^{2}), with a shoreline of 250 kilometres (160 mi). The average depth of water in the lake is about 30–40 metres (98–131 ft) with deepest depth reported to be 60 metres (200 ft). There are many Tibetan fish species in the lake. Aqua fauna noted in the lake have been listed as wild duck, goose and many other species.

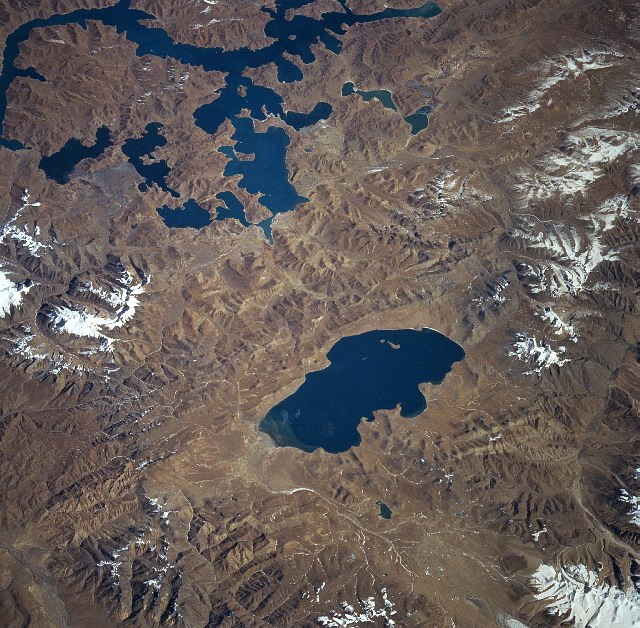
Lake Yamzho Yumco (at the top) and Lake Puma Yumco from space, November 1997

Yamdrok Lake, also known as Yamḍok Yumtso, is one of the three largest sacred lakes in Tibet and is over 72 kilometres (45 mi) long with an area of 638 square kilometres (246 mi^{2}). The lake is fan-shaped, spreading to the south but narrowing up to the north. The mountainous lakeshore is highly crenellated, with numerous bays and inlets. Lake Yamdrok freezes in winter. Like mountains, lakes are considered sacred by Tibetan people, the principle being that they are the dwelling places of protective deities and therefore invested with special spiritual powers. It is the largest lake in southern Tibet and home to the famous Samding Monastery which is on a peninsula jutting into the lake. Samding Monastery is where Dorje Phagmo, one of the few important female lamas in Tibet, stayed and presided, and stands to the south of Lake Yamdrok Yumtso.

The Yamdrok Hydropower Station was completed and dedicated in 1996 near the small village of Pai-Ti at the lake's western end. This power station is the largest in Tibet.

===== The Holy Lake =====
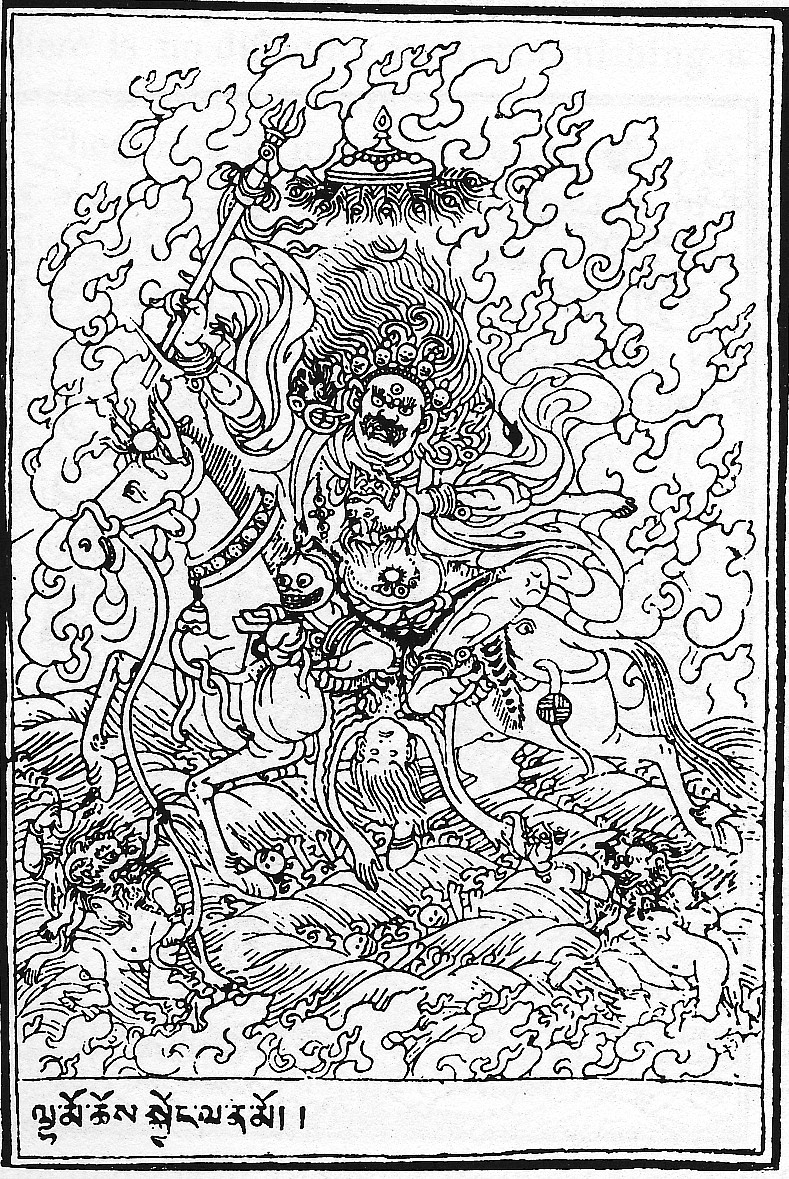
Palden Lhamo the goddess residing in the Holy Lake or Lhamo Latso

The Holy Lake, also known as the Lhamo Latso, in Gyaca County, is an alpine lake seen in the shape of horse's hoof in the midst of mountains located at an elevation of 5,100 metres (16,700 ft). It is glacier fed and has water surface area of about2 square kilometres (0.77 mi^{2}). The lake is credited with miraculous potential for oracles or prognostication of events, particularly related to the succession process of the reincarnation of the Dalai Lamas and Panchen Lamas that is stated to get reflected in this Holy Lake. This vision is sought through elaborate Buddhist rites performed by high-ranking lamas. It is said that Palden Lhamo, as the female guardian spirit of the sacred lake, Lhamo La-tso, promised Gendun Drup, the First Dalai Lama in one of his visions "that she would protect the reincarnation lineage of the Dalai Lamas." Ever since the time of Gendun Gyatso, the Second Dalai Lama, who formalised the system, the Regents and other monks have gone to the lake to seek guidance on choosing the next reincarnation through visions while meditating there. It is also believed by pilgrims that they can see visionary images of their future by looking at the lake intently in silence with deep devotion and reverence and by performing Buddhist rites. The lake thus attracts a lot of pilgrims seeking signs of their future. The lake is said to be "The Life-Spirit-Lake of the Goddess", the goddess being Palden Lhamo, the principal "Protectress" of Tibet. It was here that in 1935, the Regent, Reting Rinpoche, received a clear vision of three Tibetan letters and of a monastery with a jade-green and gold roof, and a house with turquoise roof tiles, which led to the discovery of Tenzin Gyatso, the present 14th Dalai Lama.

=== Tsangpo River ===
The Tsangpo River, until recently untapped with no storage dams across it, has been planned to be developed with a cascade of five dams on the main stem of the river in its middle reaches; the five dams proposed are the Zangmu, the Gyatsa, the Zhongda, the Jiexu and the Langzhen. The first project in the cascade is the Zangmu Dam of the Zangmu Hydro Power Station, which will have an installed capacity of 510 MW. It is 140 kilometres (87 mi) from Lhasa and construction work is expected to start soon with financing provided by Huaneng, China's top power company and Gezhouba, a leading dam building company to build the project. The dam is being built at an altitude of 3,260 metres (10,700 ft), and its height is 116 metres (381 ft) with a length of 390 metres (1,280 ft). This project will have serious implications for the downstream riparian countries of India and Bangladesh.

=== Climate and vegetation ===
The Himalayas in the south dictate the climatic conditions in the prefecture. The warm and moisture laden winds from the Indian Ocean cause the precipitation in the region and results in a temperate climate. It has short cool summers with winters being long, dry and windy. There is a wide variation in temperature between day and night. The average temperature lies between 7.4–8.9 °C (45.3–48.0 °F). The average annual precipitation reported varies from 300–400 millimetres (12–16 in) and 90% of this rainfall occurs during the monsoon months from June to September. The annual wind speed is 17 metres per second (56 ft/s) and December to March are the windy months.

The forest area in Shannan is reported to be 1.55 million ha, which is 5% of the total forest cover in Tibet. The forest resource in terms of volume has been assessed as 38.8 billion cum. The forest has rich variety of plant species; 1000 species of trees, precious wood and herbal plants have been identified. Afforestation programmes have been pursued vigorously with the result that a forest belt of 25 kilometres (16 mi) stretch has been created in the Zetang City, on the bank of the Yarlung River which helps in erosion control due to wind and river action. Thirty apple orchards set up in the prefecture produce 1,000 tonnes of fruit each year.

Climate data for Shannan (Nedong District), elevation 3,560 m (11,680 ft), (1991–2020 normals, extremes 1981–2010)
Month	Jan	Feb	Mar	Apr	May	Jun	Jul	Aug	Sep	Oct	Nov	Dec	Year
Record high °C (°F)	20.5 (68.9)	20.6 (69.1)	25.0 (77.0)	26.5 (79.7)	28.7 (83.7)	30.0 (86.0)	30.3 (86.5)	28.5 (83.3)	27.1 (80.8)	24.5 (76.1)	22.5 (72.5)	19.3 (66.7)	30.3 (86.5)
Mean daily maximum °C (°F)	9.3 (48.7)	10.8 (51.4)	14.2 (57.6)	17.2 (63.0)	20.7 (69.3)	23.9 (75.0)	23.6 (74.5)	22.7 (72.9)	21.5 (70.7)	18.4 (65.1)	13.7 (56.7)	10.3 (50.5)	17.2 (63.0)
Daily mean °C (°F)	0.8 (33.4)	3.1 (37.6)	6.7 (44.1)	9.5 (49.1)	13.2 (55.8)	16.5 (61.7)	16.5 (61.7)	15.9 (60.6)	14.5 (58.1)	10.4 (50.7)	4.8 (40.6)	1.0 (33.8)	9.4 (48.9)
Mean daily minimum °C (°F)	−6.7 (19.9)	−4.2 (24.4)	−0.3 (31.5)	2.9 (37.2)	6.8 (44.2)	10.6 (51.1)	11.6 (52.9)	11.2 (52.2)	9.4 (48.9)	4.0 (39.2)	−2.1 (28.2)	−6.2 (20.8)	3.1 (37.5)
Record low °C (°F)	−18.2 (−0.8)	−13.3 (8.1)	−10.1 (13.8)	−6.8 (19.8)	−2.6 (27.3)	0.7 (33.3)	5.8 (42.4)	4.5 (40.1)	−0.7 (30.7)	−6.1 (21.0)	−11.2 (11.8)	−14.8 (5.4)	−18.2 (−0.8)
Average precipitation mm (inches)	0.6 (0.02)	1.5 (0.06)	4.9 (0.19)	14.4 (0.57)	30.0 (1.18)	52.4 (2.06)	122.4 (4.82)	113.0 (4.45)	53.7 (2.11)	8.5 (0.33)	1.2 (0.05)	0.5 (0.02)	403.1 (15.86)
Average precipitation days (≥ 0.1 mm)	0.5	1.2	3.1	6.4	9.3	13.5	19.9	18.6	12.4	3.3	0.7	0.3	89.2
Average snowy days	1.4	2.6	6.3	5.2	1.0	0	0	0	0	1.0	1.4	0.6	19.5
Average relative humidity (%)	28	27	32	40	44	51	61	62	58	44	33	31	43
Mean monthly sunshine hours	230.2	220.5	250.8	255.9	269.9	248.3	213.8	223.0	231.7	264.2	244.3	237.8	2,890.4
Percentage possible sunshine	71	69	67	66	64	59	50	55	63	75	77	75	66
Source: China Meteorological Administration

== Administrative sub-divisions ==
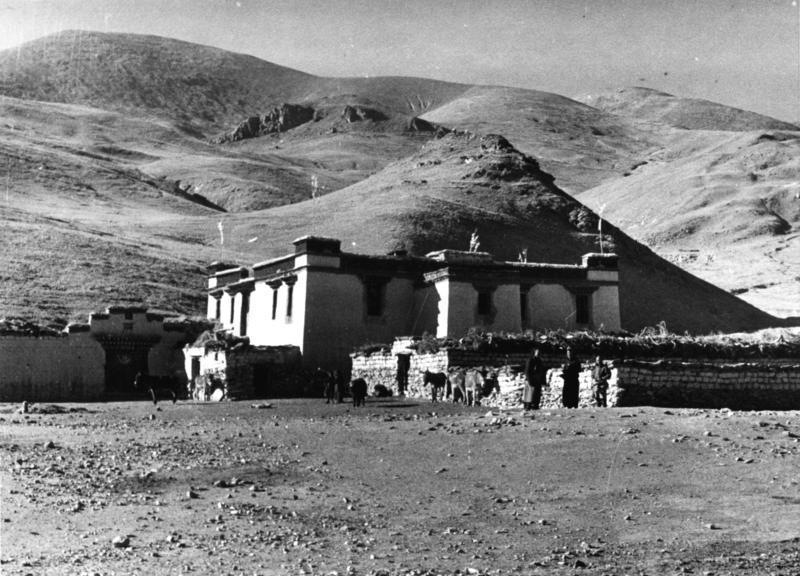
Nagarze settlement in Nagarze County, Shannan

Shannan is marked by China with a geographical area of 79,700 square kilometres (30,800 mi^{2}) distributed over 1 district and 11 counties with a total population of 330,000. However, a large part of the counties of Lhunze (隆子县) and Cona (错那县), covering an area of 28,700 square kilometres (11,100 mi^{2}) and collectively known as part of South Tibet, are shown by the Chinese government to be Tibetan Autonomous Region's territory (although currently in the control of India) and hence marked disputed. The details of the names of the county, its transliterated names in Simplified Chinese, Hanyu Pinyin, Wylie, Tibetan, population (as of 2003), area and density of population are given in the following table.

Map
Name	Simplified Chinese	Hanyu Pinyin	Tibetan	Wylie	Population (2010 census)	Area (km^{2})	Density (/km^{2})
Nêdong District	乃东区	Nǎidōng Qū	སྣེ་གདོང་་ཆུས་	sne gdong chus	59,615	2,211	26.96
Zhanang County	扎囊县	Zhānáng Xiàn	གྲ་ནང་རྫོང་	gra nang rdzong	35,473	2,157	16.44
Gonggar County	贡嘎县	Gònggā Xiàn	གོང་དཀར་རྫོང་	gong dkar rdzong	45,708	2,283	20.02
Sangri County	桑日县	Sāngrì Xiàn	ཟངས་རི་རྫོང་	zangs ri rdzong	17,261	2,634	6.55
Qonggyai County	琼结县	Qióngjié Xiàn	འཕྱོངས་རྒྱས་རྫོང་	'phyongs rgyas rdzong	17,093	1,030	16.59
Qusum County	曲松县	Qūsōng Xiàn	ཆུ་གསུམ་རྫོང་	chu gsum rdzong	14,280	1,936	7.37
Comai County	措美县	Cuòměi Xiàn	མཚོ་སྨད་རྫོང་	mtsho smad rdzong	13,641	4,530	3.01
Lhozhag County	洛扎县	Luòzhā Xiàn	ལྷོ་བྲག་རྫོང་	lho brag rdzong	18,453	5,570	3.31
Gyaca County	加查县	Jiāchá Xiàn	རྒྱ་ཚ་རྫོང་	rgya tsha rdzong	23,434	4,493	5.21
Lhünzê County	隆子县	Lóngzǐ Xiàn	ལྷུན་རྩེ་རྫོང་	lhun rtse rdzong	34,141	9,809*	3.48
Tsona City	错那市	Cuònà Shì	མཚོ་སྣ་གྲོང་ཁྱེར།	mtsho sna grong khyer	15,124	34,979*	0.43
Nagarzê County	浪卡子县	Làngkǎzǐ Xiàn	སྣ་དཀར་རྩེ་རྫོང་	sna dkar rtse rdzong	34,767	8,109	4.28
includes areas claimed in India's Arunachal Pradesh

== Demographics ==
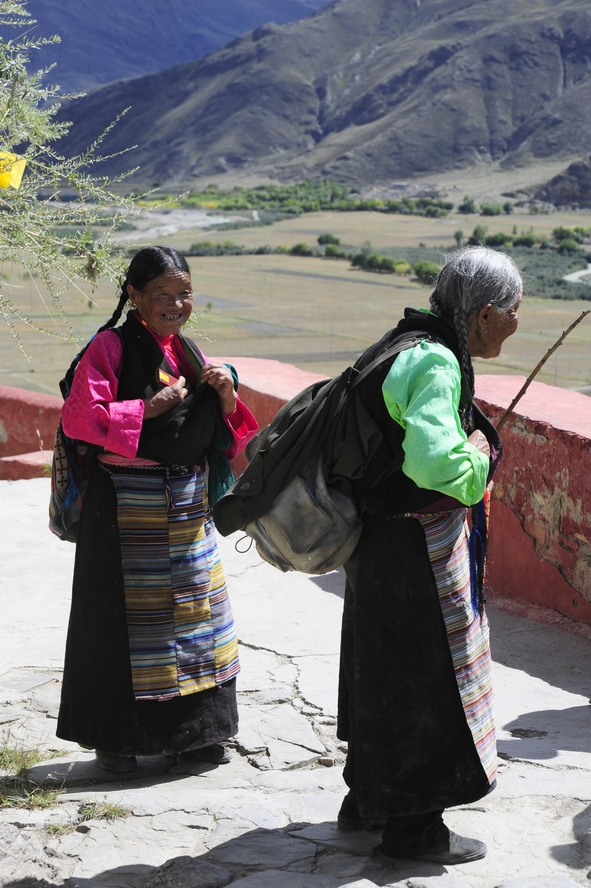
Elderly Tibetan women at Ombu Lhakang in the Yarlung Valley

The population of the city was 330,100 in 2007. Tibetans accounted for 96% of Shannan's total population.

There are 14 ethnic groups, including Tibetans, the Han, the Menba, and the Luoba, living in the area.

== Economy ==
The economy of the city has undergone substantial progress in recent years following the reform policy and opening of the area by the Tibet Autonomous Region to development support from China and other countries. The economy of the city in 2007 consisted of GDP of RMB 3.3 billion (US$441 million), which ranked sixth in the Tibet Autonomous Region. The composition of this GDP consisted of the Agriculture sector (smallest contributor)-10.1%, Secondary Industry of Industry & Construction sector −37.4% and the service sector is the Tertiary Industry as the largest contributor accounted for the balance 52.5%. The PDP per capita was RMB 7,407 (US$1,005). Consumer goods alone accounted for substantial GDP. In terms of value-added industrial output, it ranked third, next to Lhasa and Qamdo / Chamdo / Changdu.

Tourism is also an important sector contributing to the economy of the region. A Report of 2007 records a tourist footfall of 703,000. However, this sector is not fully open and is subject to the permit system controlled by many governmental agencies, and many areas are out of bounds for visitors as they are military zones or sensitive areas.

Agriculture

The city had 450,000 hectares (1,100,000 acres) of land (350,000 hectares (860,000 acres) were irrigated, which was 77% of the cultivated area) under cultivation in 1999, producing 4,725 kilograms (10,417 lb) of grain per hectare, which marked Shannan as an important commercial grain production centre in Tibet. Animal husbandry, another agrarian sector covered 2.2 million ha of posture land with all farmhouse holds involved in animal husbandry; there were 2.14 million heads of domestic animals (comprising 12 percent yaks, 10 percent cows, 50 percent sheep and goats 20 percent goats). Its agricultural tradition is traced to the ancient Yarlong tribes when the city was known as "the grain store of Tibet". The irrigated agricultural base of the city is supported by a network of 1,312 canals, 141 wells with pumping stations with installed capacity of 2,398 kilowatts; 27 irrigation pumps with an installed capacity of 1,552 kilowatts, nine reservoirs with storage of 3.31 million cubic meters and 816 water ponds. Mechanised farming is widely practiced in Lhoka region. This large extent of agriculture has resulted in increasing the per capita income of farmers and herders to 1000 yuan, a 7-fold increase over the average of 137 yuan in 1959. This has also resulted in rural prosperity and even creation of a rich farming community who have established the first "farmers hotel" in the region, and investing in real estate.

Mineral resources

The city has more than 20 types of metal and non-metal mineral resources such as chromium, gold, copper, iron, antimony, lead, zinc, manganese, mica, crystal, jade and marble. Its proven reserve of chromium is about 5 million tons, the highest in the country, which is about 35–45% of China's total resources (in a total area of 2,500 square kilometres (970 mi^{2})). It is being extracted in the Norbusa Chromite Mine. Other natural resources relate to construction industry such as marble, granite, limestone and clay, which are also abundant in the city.

Industries

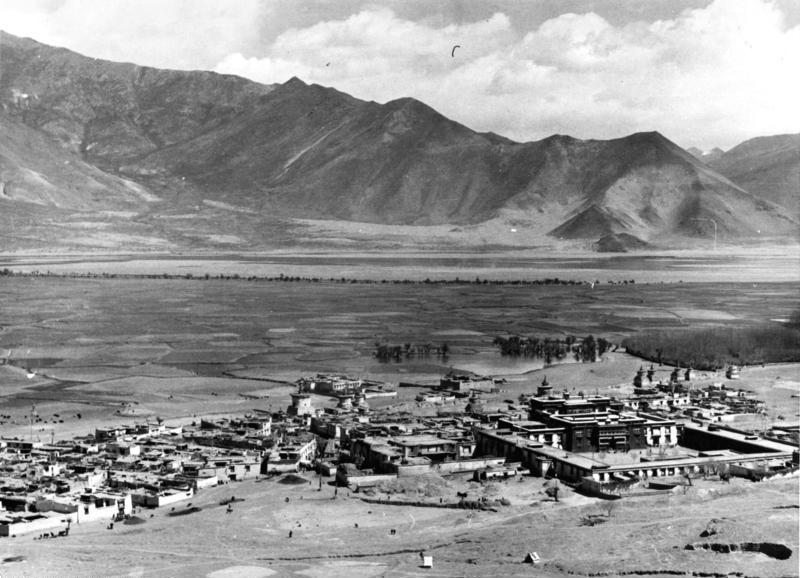
Tsetang

The industrial sector in the city, apart from service sector trading, are industries in the fields of electricity, mining, farm-implement and vehicle repairing, cement, metallurgy, printing, pharmaceuticals, food processing. Light industries for processing of agricultural and livestock products and pharmaceuticals are widely adopted by replacing manual operation with mechanization and semi-mechanization. However, most textiles and leather processing are yet to be mechanized.

Handicrafts

The ethnic handicrafts of the city have a hoary history. This has generated many opportunities to develop the handicraft industry. The most significant handicrafts of the city, which have worldwide market, are the commercial products of utility, religious use and artistic crafts of the royal families of Tibet of the past. These are: The pulu blanket, Minzholin Tibetan incense and knitted products (of Zhanang County), bagdion apron (of Gonggar County), bracelets, necklaces, incense burner of Qonggyai, carpets and butter bottles of Qusum, popular stone utensils of Zaga and Sangri, Cona handcrafted wooden bowls, butter tea Cup of Jiyayu, knife of Lhunzi (gilded with silver), Nagarze silver tea cup, jade ware of Quingje County and Tibetan quilt. Other famous consumer products are the butter of Lagong and dried meat of Yamzhog.

== Landmarks ==
The city has very unusual and rich historical monuments, natural geological features such as lakes and caves, scenic regions and religiously linked mountains. This has given a boost to the tourism industry. Some of the important landmarks are; the Lagyable Palace; the Yungbulakang Palace, the first palace in Tibet; the Tombs of Tibetan Kings; Jagsamqionpori, Gangobari of Zatong and Habort mountains, which are venerated; lakes such as Yamzogh Yumcog in Nagarzê County and the Lhamai Laco of Gyacha, which are considered as sacred; and religious places of worship such as the Dorje Drak Monastery (also spelt Do-rje-brag, or Dorjezha Monastery), the Quamzhub Monastery which is under state control, the Samding Monastery, the Samyas Monastery (the first monastery built in Tibet), Quinpu Meditation Cave and the Zayang Zang Karst Cave. Some of the notable monuments and monasteries are in the National Heritage list.

=== Yumbulakhar Palace ===
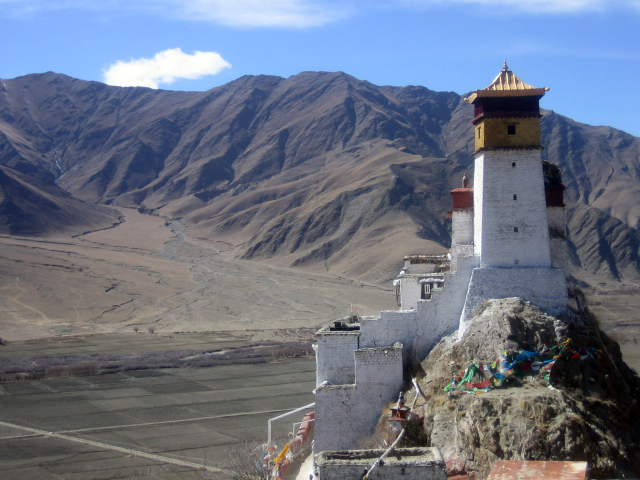
Yumbulakhang Palace

Yumbulakhar (or Yungbulakhang) Palace was the earliest palace built in Tibet between 400 BC and 200 BC, during the reign of the first King Nyatri Tsanpo, in ancient Yarlung Valley, in Nêdong District. It is 8 kilometres (5.0 mi) to the south of Zetang Town, the capital of the city. It is stated to be "several ten metres high and its magnificent contour looks like a part of the cliff." It is built like a fortress, on the apex of Mt. Tashitseri on the east bank of Yarlung River. The palace looks down over the entire Yarlung Valley. According to folk legend, the king Nyatri descended from heaven, as also the first Tibetan scriptures and few religious objects were set down here from the heaven, during the rule of the 28th King Lhatotorinyetsan. The palace walls are built in stone while the roof structure is made of earth and timber. It overlooks a farmland which is stated to be the "first farm land in Tibet." The palace is approached through a series of steps built as a measure to defend the palace from enemy attack.

=== Tombs of Tibetan Kings ===
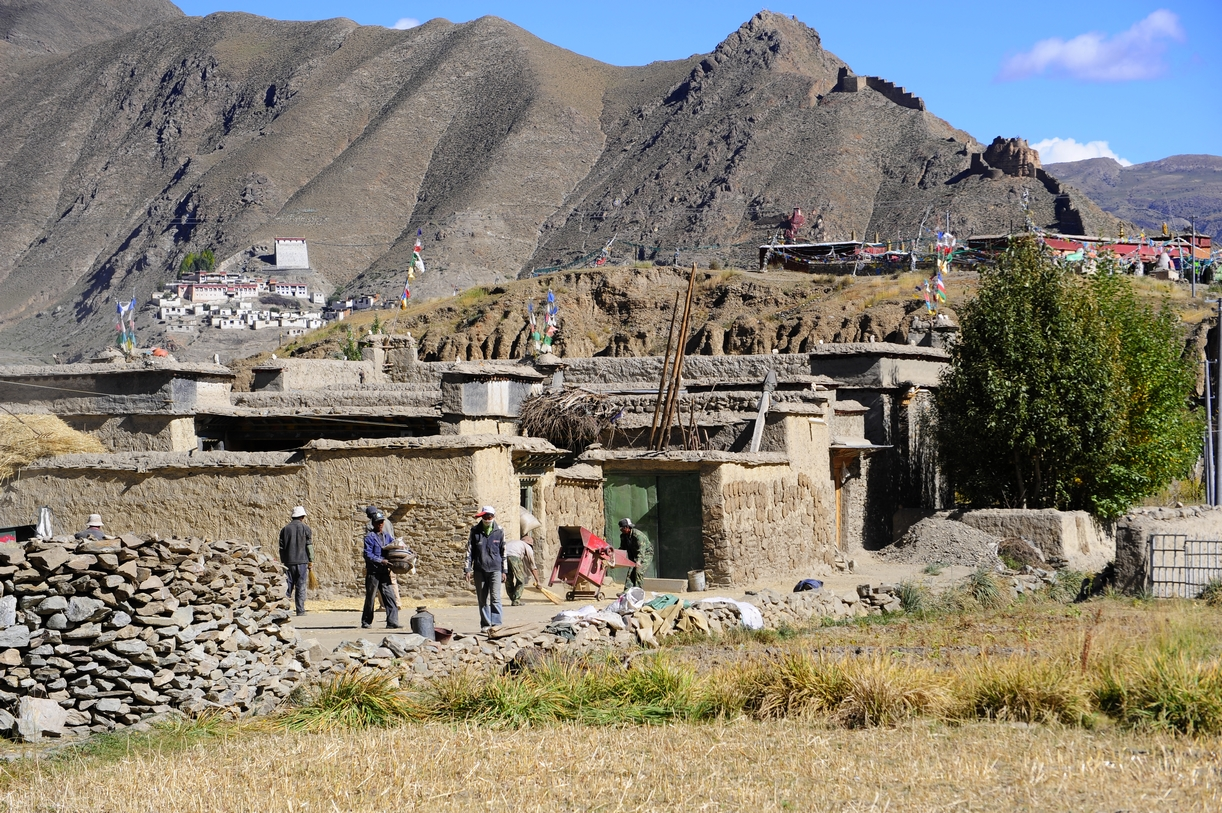
Tombs of the Tibetan Kings in the Valley

The 33rd King of Tibet, Songtsan Gampo, shifted his capital to Lhasa. He was responsible for unifying Tibet as a nation. To commemorate this achievement and to cherish the memory of his ancestors he decided to create the tumuli (means burial ground a mound of earth and stones) or the burial ground or Tombs of Tibetan Kings to bury all his ancestor Kings, from the 29th King onwards with all their ministers and concubines. To accommodate such a large number of tombs, the tumuli extends over an area of 3.85 million square meters. It is the only such tomb in Tibet. Among the various tombs, the tomb of King Songtsan Gampo is said to be unique as it has underground chambers where images of Shakyamuni and Padmasambhava with great quantities of gold, silver, pears and agates as funeral objects are kept. The coffin of the King is kept in a central chamber flanked by a suit of arms on one side and statues of his knights and battle horses made in gold on the other side. The coffin is decorated at its head end with a statue of Lord Loyak Gyalo which is supposed to be shedding light on the dead king. At the foot end of the coffin, there is a cache of pears made in gold and wrapped in silk, and it weighs 35 kilograms (77 lb).

Zamasang palace

Zamasang Palace, an 8th-century monument, now seen in ruins, was the palace of Tride Zotsan and Princess Jincheng. King Trison Detsan was born here. After Detsen's death, the Bon religious group of nobles who were opposed to Buddhism propagated by Dretsen completely destroyed the palace. Now, only a small temple in honour of Tride Zotsan and Princess Jincheng with their statues deified inside, is seen among the ruins.

Namseling Manor

Namseling Manor (རྣམ་སྲས་གླིང་གཞིས་ཀ་) founded during the reign of the Phadru dynasty between the 16th and 17th century. Namseling Manor is the earliest multi storied construction as well as one of the earliest manors in Tibet. The manor possessed a seven storied main hall. It is located in Channang Town, 25 kilometres (16 mi) from Zetang across the river, opposite to the Samye Monastery. It is a seven-storied structure accommodating flat houses, horse stables, a mill, a workshop for weaving and dyeing, a pillbox and a jail.

=== Monasteries ===
The province has many ancient monasteries in all its counties. The most prominent includes the first Tibetan Monastery in Tibet, namely, the Samye Monastery. Some of the other important monasteries are the Dorje Drak Monastery, Lhalong Monastery, the Dratang Monastery, the Sekhargutok Monastery, the Sekhargutok Monastery, the Sange Choeling Monastery, Gyigag Monastery and many more.

Samye monastery

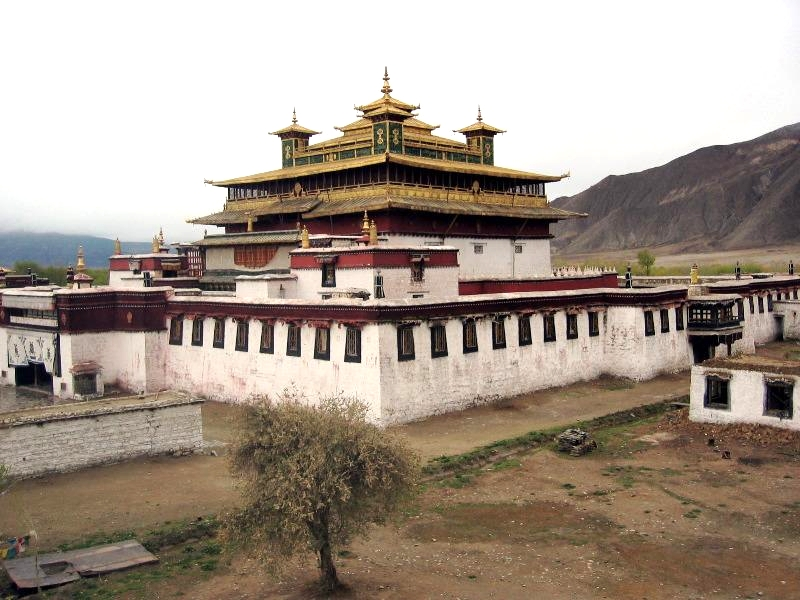
The main building of the Samye Monastery (there is a 3D model available in Google Earth)

Samye Monastery was built in 763 AD under the direction of Guru Padmasambhava under the patronage of Tibetan king Trisong Detsen. It is located on the northern bank of the Yarlung Zambo River in Dranang County. 'Samye' in Tibetan means "unexpected building." The layout of the monastery is a replication of the Odantapuri temple in Bihar, India, and represents the Buddhist cosmology. It was the first monastery built in Tibet which has a studied transition of temple architecture and Tibetan architecture. The monastery consists of halls, residence for monks, stupas and colleges. This monastery was the first of its kind in Tibet, which resulted in a transition from the temple architectural style to the Tibetan monastery style in Tibet.

The Cosmic Buddhist design also known as "the universal model described in Buddhist scriptures" adopted for the architectural planning of the monastery has involved a central temple of a hall called the Uze Hall, a three storied structure representing Mt. Sumeru, the mythical mountain, built in three different architectural styles of Tibetan, Chinese Central Plain and Indian. Frescoes adorn the inner walls while Buddha and other deities are enshrined in the main hall. The main hall has several smaller units which are termed as the Buddha hall, the sutra hall, circumambulation passage surrounding the hall, side halls and circular passages. It is surrounded by four temples which are known as the ling, representing the four continents amidst vast oceans to the north, south, east and west of Sumeru. The smaller temples flank the four temples to their right and left, which are known as the lingtren (meaning subcontinents) making up the Buddhist Universe. Two chapels for the worship of Sun and Moon are part of this complex. The entire monastery is surrounded by a circular wall (fencing wall) which has many small stupas on the top; four large stupas are in four colours namely white, red, blue and green. When the monastery was built, 7 young men of the royal family resided in the monastery as monks, apart from ordained monks. In view of this combination of royal monks, the lamas and the Buddha deified in the monastery for worship it was given the rank as the first Tibetan Monastery. The monastery has exquisite stone carvings and paintings. It is said that the main statue first descended from heaven on the Mt. Hapori from where it was shifted to the monastery. The chapel has many yak butter lamps which are carved in stone. Frescoes in the monastery depict folk athletics and dances. This monastery has been the forerunner of similar monasteries built in Tibet in the 10th century. The monastery has undergone refurbishing and additions several times during the reigns of the Sakya sect without altering the basic concept of its original plan. It was renovated recently in the 1980s with funds provided by the government.

Tradruk Monastery

Tradruk Temple, built in 641 AD in Tsedang, is one of the earliest Buddhist temples in Tibetan history. King Songtsan Gampo built this temple as a protection to his kingdom from the demoness or Ogresses. In later years, it was the winter palace of the King and Princess Wencheng. The temple has precious relics. The monastery also houses the Pear Tangka, which is 2 metres (6.6 ft) in length and 1.2 metres (3.9 ft) in width and made of 29,026 pears studded with precious stones. The Thangka was painted by Naidong during the reign of Pamodrupa Kingdom.

Lhalong Monastery

Built in 1155, Lhalong Monastery is located at Monda in Lhozhag County. It initially belonged to the Karma Sect but was later brought under Gelukpa Sect by the Fifth Dalai Lama, in the mid-17th century. The monastery also enjoyed the patronage of emperors of the Qing dynasty. It became famous throughout Tibet as in this monastery lama Lhalong Pekyi Dorje put an end to the Tubo dynasty by murdering the last Tibetan king Langdarma, the first ruler of unified Tibetan Empire.

Dratang Monastery

Dratang Monastery was built in 1081 by Drapa Eshepa who was one of the 13 saints in Dranang County. Its allegiance is to the Sakyapa Sect, The monastery built on the pattern of the Somye Monastery has been substantially damaged, and now only walls on three sides remain (about 750 metres (2,460 ft)) and only one of the three floors is intact. It has some valuable frescoes.

Sekhargutok Monastery

Sekhargutok Monastery was built in 1080 AD It is located in Lhodrak County. It was built by the well-known Buddhist Guru Mharpa's disciple Milarepa to atone for his sins. It is stated to be of unique architecture and contains rare Tibetan paintings.

Sange Choeling Monastery

The Sange Choeling Monastery, built in 1515 AD belongs to the Drupa Kang Yukpa Sect. It is spread over an area of3,000 square metres (32,000 ft^{2}). In the past, it had a vast estate extending from the Lhuntse Valley to Chabochu River.

Gyigag Monastery

Gyigag Monastery is a stop-over point as part of the once in 12 years circumambulatory circuit of the holy mountains undertaken by Buddhist pilgrims.

Habori Mountain

Habori Mountain, once supposedly a haunted mountain, was subdued to ensure trouble-free construction of the Samye Monastery. The devils were traditionally subdued by Guru Padmasambahva.

=== Meditation caves ===
Nyimalung Holy cave

Nyimalung Holy Cave is where Guru Padmasambhva meditated. There is small temple in front of the cave where the Guru and the Fifth Dalai Lama are said to have recited the Longevity Sutra.

Qingpo Meditation caves

Qingpo Meditation Caves are set at 3,400 metres (11,200 ft) elevation, surrounded by Narui Mountains on three sides with Yarlung Zangbo River flowing to its south. This cave is where Guru Padmasambhava and King Trison Detsan are said to have learned and propagated Buddhism; Buddhist scriptures were buried here. The cave complex originally consisted of 108 meditation caves out of which 40 caves exist. Also seen are 108 celestial burial chambers of eminent monks of Nyingma Sect and also rock paintings dated to the 14th century. It is located 15 kilometres (9.3 mi) to the northeast of Samye Monastery.

Zhayang Zong Lava cave

Zhayang Zong Lava Cave is in the Channang County amidst Zayangzong Mountain. There are three caves, two are exposed on the southern side and the third cave is interlinked. The largest cave, which has a Buddha hall and a Sutra hall, is 13 metres (43 ft) deep, 11 metres (36 ft) wide, 15 metres (49 ft) in height. The residential quarters of monks are located outside the cave. The second cave to the west of the large cave is where Padmasambhava lived while preaching Buddhism. This cave is interconnected with the bigger cave through a passage. The third cave is 10 metres (33 ft) wide and 55 metres (180 ft) deep. It has a collection of stones in different shapes and sizes.

=== Shannan museum ===
Museum of Shannan is a History Museum, which displays cultural heritage of the city's history in relation to that of Tibet, for over several centuries. The artefacts on display are pottery ware, stone and metal tools, stone tablets, stone carvings, seals, documents and patra-leaf scriptures.

== Festivals ==
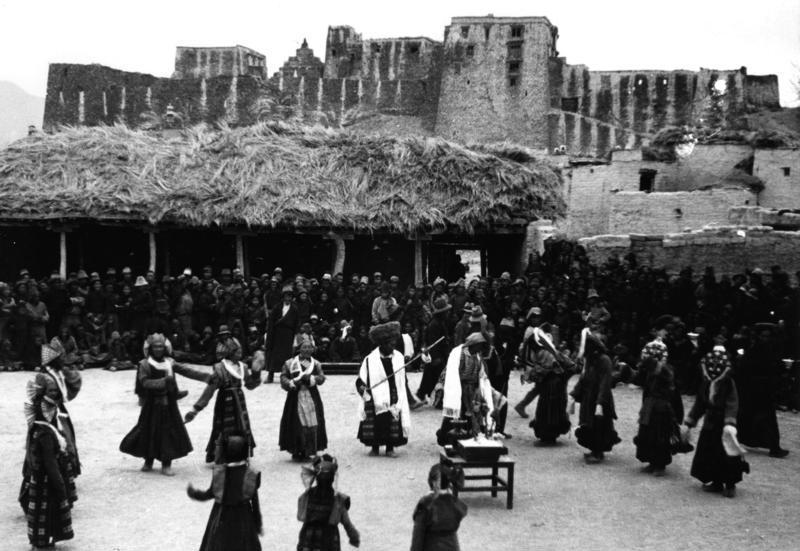
Lamo, Tibetan folk opera held below Gonggar Dzong castle, before it was destroyed during "peaceful liberation"

Many festivals are held in Lhoka region in its counties, district, monasteries and villages to celebrate the harvest season, the New Year or Losar and natural elements such as birds. A colourful and widely celebrated festival is the Ongkor (Bumper Harvest) Festival which is observed in June according to the Tibetan calendar, in the riverine areas to mark good harvests of the season.

Festival of birds

The festival for worship of birds is called in Chinese 'yingniao jie.' It is a religious festival that is special to the Bon or Bonpo community, which still practices the original pre-Buddhist religion of Tibet known as Bön. During this festival, cuckoo, the spring bird, which is considered the king of all birds arrives in the naidong qiasalakang temple in Tsedang, the Bird's temple; according to a specific Tibetan calendar date, corresponding to May as per Gregorian calendar. The festival is also observed in a different month at the Reting Monastery and celebrated until the Cuckoo is seen chirping and accepting food offerings in the monastery grounds. The bird temple has a large Buddha statue cast by King Baikezan. On this occasion birds are given a red carpet welcome at Linka with a tribute of food items such as the Tibetan Highland barley, wheat, peas and other grains on a platter placed on a table. Two butter lamps are also lighted near the table. Two lamas are specially deputed from Lhasa to organise and perform this religious festival. The first cuckoo bird known locally as "Kuda" arrives as a messenger of the Cuckoo king of birds and after a survey of the arrangements made in the Linka, the chief Cuckoo bird arrives formally by performing "Xiezha" at the grounds where a table is set with offerings for the bird. Arrival of these spring birds every year and hearing its chirping is considered as an auspicious sign by the Tibetan people to usher a good cropping season; the birds have been the mascot for Tibetan people since ancient times.

== Education ==
Shannan has emerged from a 90% illiteracy rate in the 1950s to 65.4 literacy rate now. It now has public-run schools from kindergarten, primary school, middle school, secondary teachers school and secondary vocational school. Further, adult education through night schools, continued education classes, literacy classes and technical training classes are functioning in most villages.

== Health ==
Health care has been given priority attention in the city and its 1 district and 11 counties, and as a result it is reported that the life span of individuals has shown a dramatic rise, from 36 years in 1951 to 65 years in 1997. Family planning measures have been effective, resulting in a growth rate of less than 12 per thousand.

Shannan has a People's Hospital functioning since 1951, 195 medical and health centres with 747 hospital beds, a health and quarantine station with sub centres in the counties and the Health Care Hospital for Women and Children; the main hospitals have modern equipment such as fibre gastroscopy, B-type ultrasound diagnostic equipment, electrocardiogram and electroencephalogram, x-ray machines and several other diagnostic and treatment tools. Apart from modern medical facilities, the traditional Tibetan Medicinal practice has also been promoted in the prefecture and as a result a traditional Tibetan medicine hospital has been set up with 80 hospital beds. Tibetan medicines have been well received by people, with the Tibetan Hospital Pharmaceutical Factory in Shannan producing about 170 varieties of Tibetan medicines.

== Transport and infrastructure ==
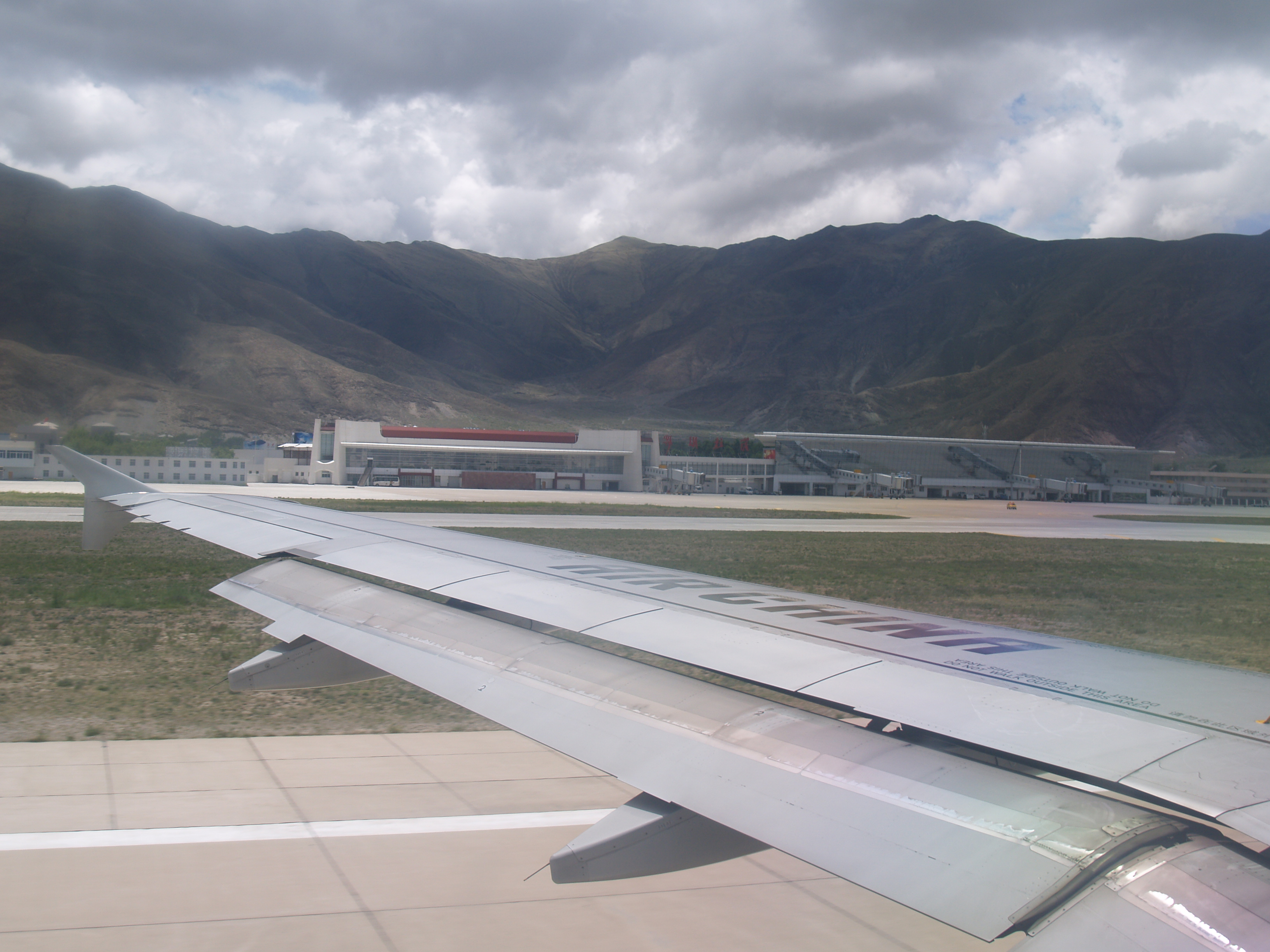
Lhasa Airport in Gonggar County

The city has a very large network of roads amounting to 3,700 kilometres (2,300 mi), covering all villages and towns. The road emanates from the Tsetang town and spreads to all its 12 counties. The strategic bridge, Qu Shui Bridge across the Yarlung Zangbo River, links Shannan with Lhasa. The city also has the Lhasa Gonggar Airport in Gonggar County, which is 65 kilometres (40 mi) from Lhasa and which is known as the "air way door" to Tibet, as well as the Shannan Longzi Airport in Lhünzê County. The Lhasa airport has direct air links with Beijing, Chengdu, Shanghai, Guangzhou, Chongqing, Xi'an, and Kunming. In addition, there are also international flights to Kathmandu and Hong Kong. It is 191 km (119 mi) from Lhasa. Regular buses operate from the two cities of Tsetang and Lhasa every day to the airport.

From the time Tibet Autonomous Region has been opened for other countries, development of many infrastructure and social sectors have recorded dramatic progress such as education, telecommunications and tourism.

The posts and telecommunications facilities first established in 1956 have now optical fiber link between Zetang and Lhasa. As a result, program-controlled telephones, personal pagers, mobile telephones and other modern communication facilities are linked with the national network. Zetang also has landlines, microwave and satellite communications and postal delivery vehicles.

== Sister Cities ==
- Bhaktapur, Nepal

== Bibliography ==
- Booz, Elisabeth Benson (1986), Tibet, Chicago: Passport Books, ISBN 0-8442-9812-3
  - Booz, Elisabeth Benson (1997), Tibet (Second ed.), Hongkong: Odyssey, ISBN 962-217-420-5 – via archive.org
- Buckley, Michael (2006). Tibet. Bradt Travel Guides. ISBN 1-84162-164-1 – via archive.org.
