= Tradruk Temple =

Tibetan Buddhist monastery in Yarlung Valley, Tibet, China

- ཁྲ་འབྲུག་དགོན་པ
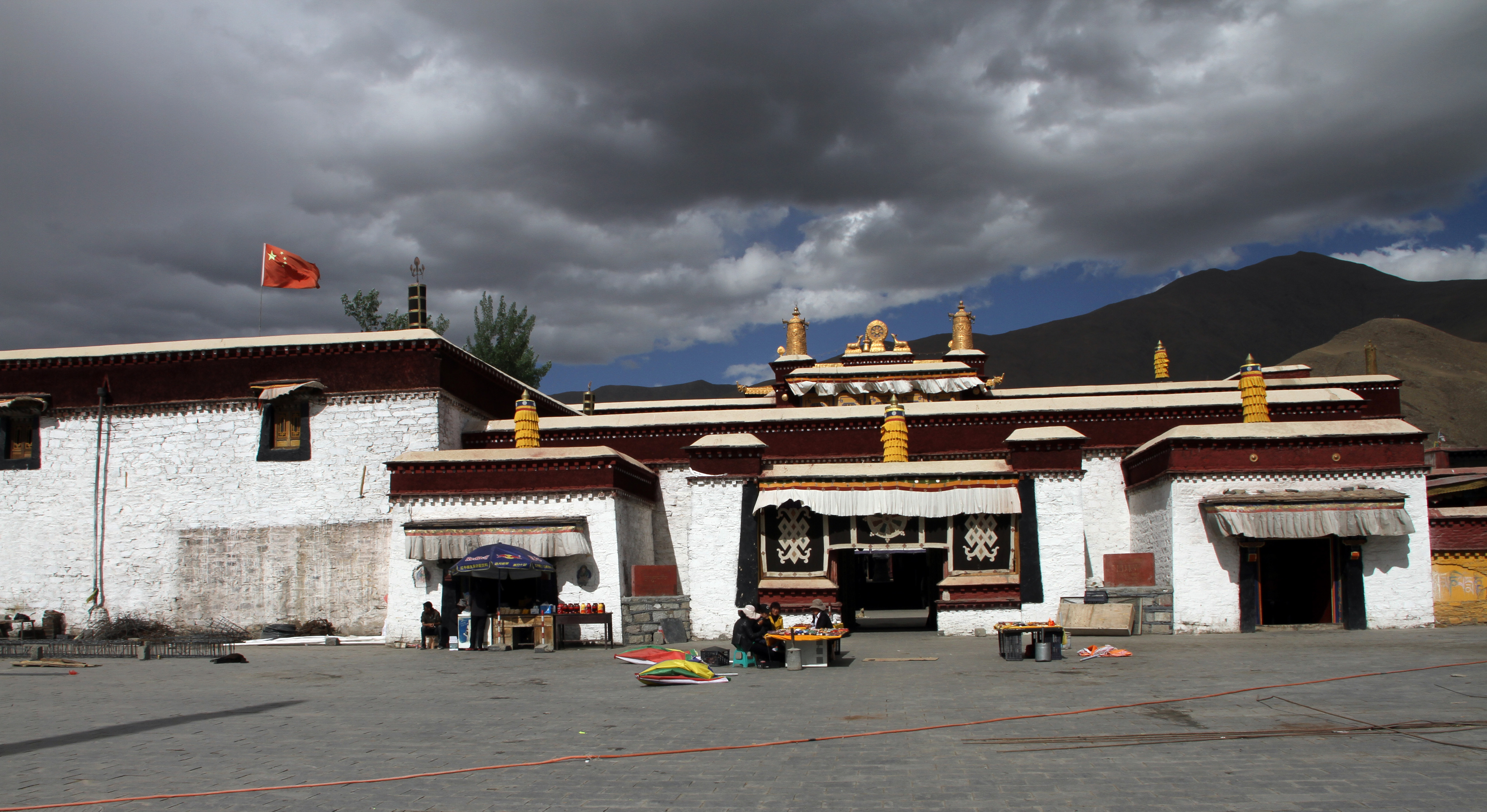
- Front gate of Tradruk Monastery

- Location within Tibet

Religion
- Affiliation: Tibetan Buddhism

Location
- Location: Lhoka, Tibet Autonomous Region, China
- Coordinates: 29°11′38″N 91°46′19″E

Architecture
- Established: 7th century

- Tradruk Temple

Tibetan name
- Tibetan: ཁྲ་འབྲུག་དགོན་པ།
Transcriptions
- Wylie: khra ’brug dgon pa
- Lhasa IPA: Tibetan pronunciation: [ʈʂʰaŋʈʂuk kø̃pa]

Tradruk Temple (Tibetan: ཁྲ་འབྲུག་དགོན་པ།, Wylie: khra-’brug dgon-pa, Lhasa dialect: [ʈʂʰaŋʈʂuk kø̃pa], referred to as Changzhu Monastery in Chinese) in the Yarlung Valley is the earliest great geomantic temple after the Jokhang and some sources say it predates that temple.

Tradruk Temple is located in Nêdong County of Lhoka in the Tibet Autonomous Region, about seven kilometres south of the county seat, Tsetang.

== Founding legends ==
Tradruk Monastery is the largest and most important of the surviving royal foundations in the Yarlung Valley. It is said to have been founded in the 7th century under king Songtsen Gampo.

According to one legend, Tradruk was one of twelve geomantic temples, the Tadül "Border Subduers" (Tibetan: མཐའ་འདུལ་, Wylie: mtha' 'dul) and Yangdül "Further Taming [Temples]" (Tibetan: ཡང་འདུལ་, Wylie: yang 'dul), that were built to hold down the huge supine ogress (Tibetan: སྲིན་མོ་, Wylie: srin mo, Sanskrit: राक्षसि rākṣasi) under Tibet: Tradruk was said to stand on her left shoulder, Katsel (Tibetan: ཀ་རྩལ་, Wylie: ka rtsal, Tibetan: བཀའ་ཚལ་, Wylie: bka’ tshal or Tibetan: བཀའ་རྩལ, Wylie: bka’ rtsal) and Gyama (Tibetan: རྒྱ་མ་, Wylie: rgya ma) in Maizhokunggar County on her right shoulder and the Jokhang in Lhasa on her heart. According to another legend, at the site of the monastery there was originally a lake inhabited by a dragon with five heads. Songtsen Gampo was able to call a huge falcon by meditation, which defeated the dragon and drank all the water of the lake, so that the temple could be built. This legend would explain the name of the temple.

== History ==
Tradruk is said to have been the second of Tibet's earliest great geomantric temples after the Jokhang, and some sources even place it earlier. Under the rule of Trisong Detsen (755–797) and Muné Tsenpo, Tradruk was one of the three royal monasteries.

During the persecution of Buddhism under Langdarma (Wylie: glang dar ma, 841–846) and during the Mongol invasion from Dzungaria in the 16th century, the monastery was heavily damaged.

In 1351, Tradruk was restored and enlarged; during the reign of the 5th Dalai Lama (1642–1682), the monastery got a golden roof and under the 7th Dalai Lama (1751–1757), it was further expanded. In the late 18th century, Tradruk is said to have had 21 temples.

Several buildings were destroyed during the Cultural Revolution. During the 1980s, the monastery was renovated and in 1988 it was reconsecrated. Today, the complex has an area of 4667 square metres and is under national protection.

Tradruk is a stop on the Yarlung pilgrimage route called "three sanctuaries, three chortens."

Alternate names are: Trandruk, Tradruk, Tradrug, Trandrug, Trangdruk, Trhandruk, Trangdruk, Traduk, 昌珠寺, changzhu si, g.yo ru khra 'brug bkra shis byams snyoms lha khang.

== Architecture and craftwork ==
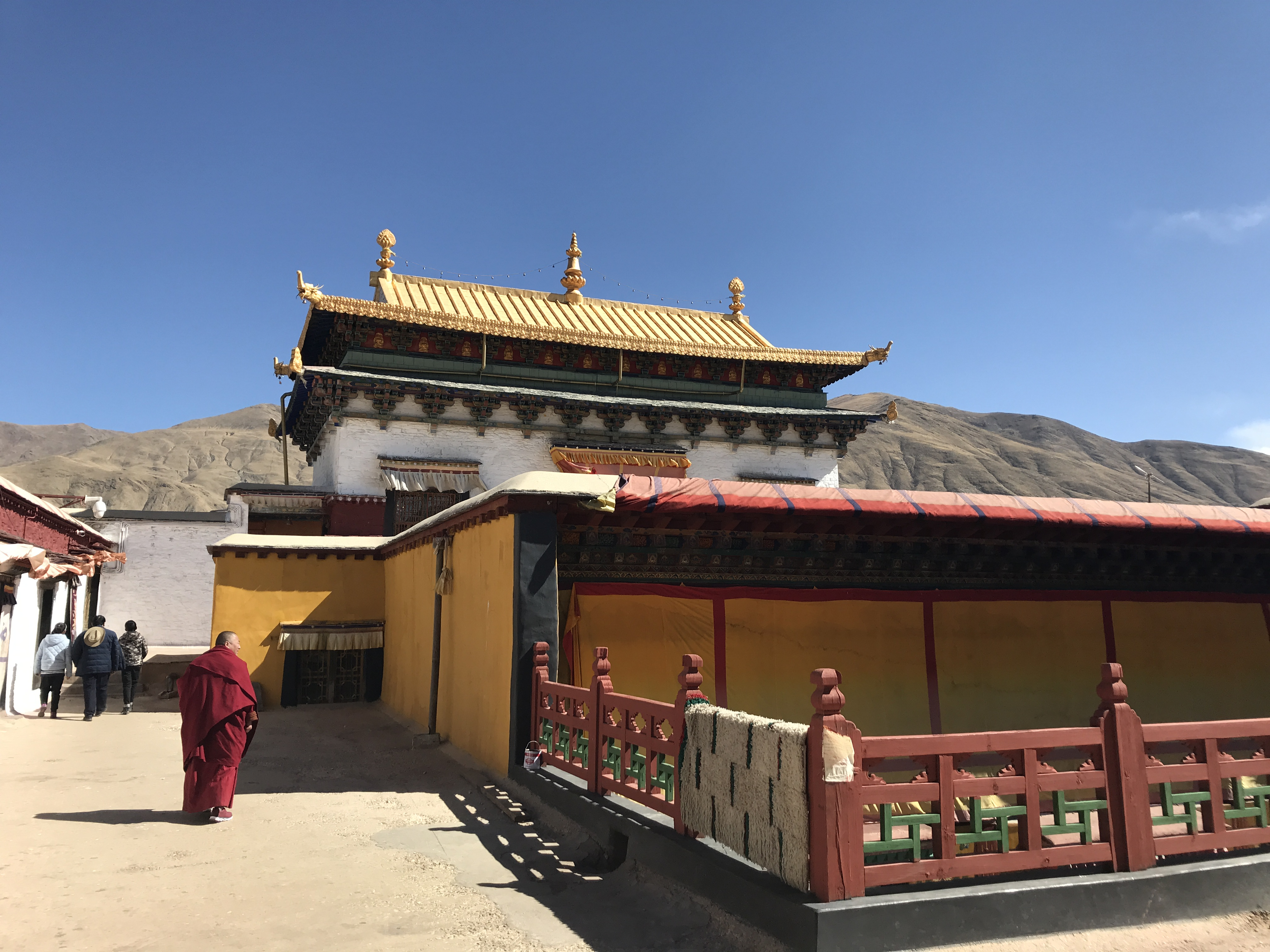
Main hall

The centre of the temple is the innermost chapel, which is said to date back to the original temple built by Songtsen Gampo; according to the legend, it held Buddha statues of stone and a Tara statue. Today, the chapel houses clay figures which are said to contain fragments of the original statues.

The most important treasure of Tradruk is a thangka embroidered with thousands of pearls which is said to have been made by Princess Wencheng herself. It depicts Wencheng as White Tara. The thangka is kept in the central chapel on the upper floor. It is one of only three thangkas made by Wencheng. The two others are in the reliquary stupa of the 5th Dalai Lama in the Potala Palace in Lhasa and in Xigazê. There is a famous "talking" statue of Padmasambhava at the age of eight years in the same room in Tradruk.

Tradruk used to have a famous bell on the verandah which is not in the monastery any more with an inscription containing the name of Trisong Detsen, who probably enlarged and embellished the original buildings.

The inscription on the bell read:

"This great bell was installed here to tell the increase of the life-time of the divine btsan-po Khri Lde-srong-brtsan. The donor Queen Byang-chub had it made to sound like the sound of the drum roll of the gods in the heavens and it was cast by the abbot, the Chinese monk Rin-cen as a religious offering from Tshal and to call all creatures to virtue."

The main building is surrounded by several smaller shrines.

== Rituals ==
Each year in June, ritual dances are staged at Tradruk known as the Métok Chöpa "Flower Offering" (Wylie: me tog mchod pa).
