= Tibetan pinyin =

Official transcription system for the Tibetan language in China

The SASM/GNC/SRC romanization of Standard Tibetan, commonly known as Tibetan pinyin or ZWPY (Chinese: 藏文拼音; pinyin: Zàngwén Pīnyīn), is the official transcription system for the Tibetan language in China. It is based on the pronunciation used by China National Radio's Tibetan Radio, which is based on the Lhasa dialect. It has been used within China and international cartographic products as an alternative to the Wylie transliteration for writing Tibetan in the Latin script since 1982.

Tibetan pinyin is a phonetic transcription, and as such its spelling is tied to actual pronunciation (although tone is not marked). Wylie on the other hand is a transliteration system, where mechanical conversion to and from Tibetan and Latin script is possible. Within academic circles, Wylie transliteration (with a v replacing the apostrophe) is more commonly used.

== Overview ==
=== Onsets overview ===
Independent onsets in the initial syllable of a word are transcribed as follows:

ཀ་	ཁ་ ག་	ང་	ཅ་	ཇ་ ཆ་	ཉ་	ཏ་	ད་ ཐ་	ན་	པ་	ཕ་ བ་	མ་	ཙ་	ཛ་ ཚ་	ཝ་	ཞ་ ཤ་	ཟ་ ས་	ཡ་	ར་	ལ་	ཧ་	ཀྱ་	ཁྱ་ གྱ་	ཧྱ་	ཀྲ་	ཁྲ་ གྲ་	ཧྲ་	ལྷ་	རྷ་
g	k	ng	j	q	ny	d	t	n	b	p	m	z	c	w	x	s	y	r	l	h	gy	ky	hy	zh	ch	sh	lh	rh

For more general case, see § Onsets.

=== Vowels and final consonant ===
The 17 vowels of the Lhasa dialect are represented in as follows:

IPA	Tibetan pinyin	IPA	Tibetan pinyin
i	i	ĩ	in
e	ê	ẽ	en
ɛ	ai/ä	ɛ̃	ain/än
a	a	ã	an
u	u	ũ	un
o	ô	õ	on
ɔ	o	ɔ̃	ǒn
y	ü	ỹ	ün
ø	oi/ö	ø̃	oin/ön

Ending a syllable, -r is usually not pronounced, but it lengthens the preceding vowel. In the same place, -n usually nasalises the preceding vowel. Consonants at the end of a syllable are transcribed as follows:

IPA	Tibetan pinyin
ʔ̞	b/•
ʔ	g/—
r	r
m	m
ŋ	ng

== Single syllable orthography ==
The tone of a syllable depends mostly on its initial consonant. In this table, each initial is given in the International Phonetic Alphabet (IPA) with the vowel a and a tone mark to present tone register (high/low).

=== Onsets ===
Below is a comprehensive transcription table of onsets of an initial syllable of a word. If the syllable to transcribe is not the first syllable of a word, see § Onset variation.

IPA	Wylie transliteration	Tibetan pinyin	THL
pá	p [པ], sp [སྤ], dp [དཔ], lp [ལྤ]	b	p
pà	rb [རྦ], sb [སྦ], sbr [སྦྲ]	b	b
mpà	lb [ལབ], 'b [འབ]	b	b
pʰá	ph [ཕ], 'ph [འཕ]	p	p
pʰà	b [བ]	p	b
bà	bh [བཧ]	bh	bh
má	rm [རྨ], sm [སྨ], dm [དམ], smr [སྨྲ]	m	m
mà	m [མ], mr [མྲ]	m	m
wà	w [ཝ] (Note: as in Namjagbarwa), db [དབ], b [བ]	w	w
tá	t [ཏ], rt [རྟ], lt [ལྟ], st [སྟ], tw [ཏྭ], gt [གཏ], bt [བཏ], brt [བརྟ], blt [བལྟ], bst [བསྟ], bld [བལྡ]	d	t
tà	rd [རྡ], sd [སྡ], gd [གད], bd [བད], brd [བརྡ], bsd [བསྡ]	d	d
ntá	lth [ལཐ]	d	
ntà	zl [ལཟ], bzl [བལཟ], ld [ལྡ], md [མད], 'd [འད]	d	d
tʰá	th [ཐ], mth [མཐ], 'th [འཐ]	t	t
tʰà	d [ད], dw [དྭ]	t	d
ná	rn, sn, gn, brn, bsn, mn	n	n
nà	n	n	n
lá	kl, gl, bl, rl, sl, brl, bsl	l	l
là	l, lw	l	l
l̥á	lh	lh	lh
tsá	ts, rts, sts, rtsw, stsw, gts, bts, brts, bsts	z	ts
tsà	rdz, gdz, brdz	z	dz
ntsà	mdz, 'dz	z	dz
tsʰá	tsh, tshw, mtsh, 'tsh	c	ts
tsʰà	dz	c	dz
sá	s, sr, sw, gs, bs, bsr	s	s
sà	z, zw, gz, bz	s	z
ʈʂá	kr, rkr, lkr, skr, tr, pr, lpr, spr, dkr, dpr, bkr, bskr, bsr	zh	tr
ʈʂà	rgr, lgr, sgr, dgr, dbr, bsgr, rbr, lbr, sbr	zh	dr
ɳʈʂà	mgr, 'gr, 'dr, 'br	zh	dr
ʈʂʰá	khr, thr, phr, mkhr, 'khr, 'phr	ch	tr
ʈʂʰà	gr, dr, br, grw	ch	dr
ʂá	hr	sh	hr
rà	r, rw	r	r
r̥á	rh	rh	
cá	ky, rky, lky, sky, dky, bky, brky, bsky	gy	ky
cà	rgy, lgy, sgy, dgy, bgy, brgy, bsgy	gy	gy
ɲcà	mgy, 'gy	gy	gy
cʰá	khy, mkhy, 'khy	ky	khy
cʰà	gy	ky	gy
çá	hy	hy	hy
tɕá	c, cw, gc, bc, lc, py, lpy, spy, dpy	j	ch
tɕà	rby, lby, sby, rj, gj, brj	j	j
ɲtɕà	lj, mj, 'j, 'by	j	j
tɕʰá	ch, mch, 'ch, phy, 'phy	q	ch
tɕʰà	j, by	q	j
ɕá	sh, shw, gsh, bsh	x	sh
ɕà	zh, zhw, gzh, bzh	x	zh
ɲá	rny, sny, gny, brny, bsny, mny, nyw, rmy, smy	ny	ny
ɲà	ny, my	ny	ny
já	g.y	y	y
jà	y, dby	y	y
ká	k, rk, lk, sk, kw, dk, bk, brk, bsk	g	k
kà	rg, lg, sg, dg, bg, brg, bsg	g	g
ŋkà	lg, mg, 'g	g	g
kʰá	kh, khw, mkh, 'kh	k	kh
kʰà	g, gw	k	g
ŋá	rng, lng, sng, dng, brng, bsng, mng	ng	ng
ŋà	ng	ng	ng
ʔá	—, db	—	—
ʔ̞à	'	—	—
há	h, hw	h	h

=== Rimes ===
Below is a comprehensive transcription table of rimes of a final syllable of a word, with IPA transcription for the Lhasa dialect. If the syllable to transcribe is not the final syllable of a word, see § Coda variation.

Take "ཨ" to be the consonant (not "◌").

Tibetan	ཨ།	ཨའུ།	ཨར།	ཨལ། ཨའི།	ཨད། ཨས།	ཨག། ཨགས།	ཨབ། ཨབས།	ཨང༌། ཨངས།	ཨམ། ཨམས།	ཨན།
Wylie	a	a'u	ar	al a'i	ad as	ag ags	ab abs	ang angs	am ams	an
Pinyin	a	au	ar	ai/ä		ag	ab	ang	am	ain/än
IPA	[a]	[au̯]	[aː]	[ɛː]	[ɛ]	[ʌʡ] ~ [ɤʡ]	[ʌʡ̆] ~ [ɤʡ̆]	[aŋ]	[am]	[ɛ̃ː]
Tibetan	ཨི།	ཨིའུ། ཨེའུ།	ཨིར།	ཨིལ། ཨའི།	ཨིད། ཨིས།	ཨིག། ཨིགས།	ཨིབ། ཨིབས།	ཨིང༌། ཨིངས།	ཨིམ། ཨིམས།	ཨིན།
Wylie	i	i'u	ir	il a'i	id is	ig igs	ib ibs	ing ings	im ims	in
Pinyin	i	iu	ir	i		ig	ib	ing	im	in
IPA	[i]	[iu̯]	[iː]	[iː]	[i]	[iʡ]	[iʡ̆]	[ɪŋ]	[ɪm]	[ĩː]
Tibetan	ཨུ།		ཨུར།	ཨུལ། ཨུའི།	ཨུད། ཨུས།	ཨུག། ཨུགས།	ཨུབ། ཨུབས།	ཨུང༌། ཨུངས།	ཨུམ། ཨུམས།	ཨུན།
Wylie	u		ur	ul u'i	ud us	ug ugs	ub ubs	ung ungs	um ums	un
Pinyin	u		ur	ü		ug	ub	ung	um	ün
IPA	[u]		[uː]	[yː]	[y]	[uʡ]	[uʡ̆]	[ʊŋ]	[ʊm]	[ỹː]
Tibetan	ཨེ།		ཨེར།	ཨེལ། ཨེའི།	ཨེད། ཨེས།	ཨེག། ཨེགས།	ཨེབ། ཨེབས།	ཨེང༌། ཨེངས།	ཨེམ། ཨེམས།	ཨེན།
Wylie	e		er	el e'i	ed es	eg egs	eb ebs	eng engs	em ems	en
Pinyin	ê		êr	ê		êg	êb	êng	êm	ên
IPA	[e]		[eː]	[eː]	[e]	[ɛ̈ʡ]	[ɛ̈ʡ̆]	[ɛŋ]	[ɛm]	[ẽː]
Tibetan	ཨོ།	ཨོའུ།	ཨོར།	ཨོལ། ཨོའི།	ཨོད། ཨོས།	ཨོག། ཨོགས།	ཨོབ། ཨོབས།	ཨོང༌། ཨོངས།	ཨོམ། ཨོམས།	ཨོན།
Wylie	o	o'u	or	ol o'i	od os	og ogs	ob obs	ong ongs	om oms	on
Pinyin	ô	ou	ôr	oi/ö		ôg	ôb	ông	ôm	oin/ön
IPA	[o]	[ou̯]	[oː]	[øː]	[ø]	[ɔʡ]	[ɔʡ̆]	[ɔŋ]	[ɔm]	[ø̃ː]

== Intersyllable influence ==
=== Onset variation ===
Bare low aspirated variation

- k*, q*, t*, p*, x*, s*, ky*, ch* become g*, j*, d*, b*, ?*, ?*, gy*, zh* respectively
- pa* (་བ) and po* (་བོ) become wa and wo respectively

=== Coda variation ===
Sometimes there is intersyllabic influence:

Tibetan script	Wylie (EWTS)	Tibetan pinyin	Lhasa IPA	Explanation
མ་ཕམ་གཡུ་མཚོ།	ma pham g.yu mtsho	Mapam Yumco	[mapʰam jumtsʰo]	forward shift of prefix མ
ཁྲ་འབྲུག་དགོན་པ།	khra 'brug dgon pa	Changzhug Gönba	[ʈ͡ʂʰaŋʈ͡ʂ˭uk k˭ø̃p˭a]	shift of the prefix འ (ཨ་ཆུང a chung), creating a final nasal consonant

== Encoding ==
The IETF language tag for Tibetan pinyin is bo-Latn-pinyin.

== Examples ==
Tibetan Script	Wylie	Tibetan pinyin	THL	other transcriptions
གཞིས་ཀ་རྩེ་	gzhis ka rtse	Xigazê	Zhikatse	Shigatse, Shikatse
བཀྲ་ཤིས་ལྷུན་པོ་	bkra shis lhun po	Zhaxilhünbo	Trashilhünpo	Tashilhunpo, Tashilhümpo, etc.
འབྲས་སྤུང་	'bras spung	Zhäbung	Dräpung	Drebung
ཆོས་ཀྱི་རྒྱལ་མཚན་	chos kyi rgyal mtshan	Qögyi Gyäcän	Chökyi Gyältshän	Choekyi Gyaltsen
ཐུབ་བསྟན་རྒྱ་མཚོ་	thub bstan rgya mtsho	Tubdän Gyaco	Thuptän Gyatsho	Thubten Gyatso, Thubtan Gyatso, Thupten Gyatso

== See also ==
- Hanyu pinyin
- Standard Tibetan
- THL Simplified Phonetic Transcription
- Tibetan script
- Wylie transliteration
- Roman Dzongkha
