= Trinyen Songtsen =

King of Tibet

Trinyen Zungtsen ཁྲི་གཉན་གཟུངས་བཙན
- Tsenpo

29nd King of Tibet
- Reign: c. 512–537
- Predecessor: Thothori Nyantsen
- Successor: Drongnyen Deu
- House: House of Yarlung
- Father: Thothori Nyantsen
- Religion: Bon

Trinyen Songtsen (Tibetan: ཁྲི་གཉན་གཟུངས་བཙན; Wylie: Khri-gnyan gZung-btsan) was the 29th King of Bod according to Tibetan legendary tradition. He was one of the legendary kings and the first of the so-called Pre-Imperial Period (493–630). Before him there were the so-called Five Unifying Kings whose names ended in Tsen.

== Life ==
Trinyen Songtsen was the son of Thothori Nyantsen

The Tibetan Annals state that like his father, Trinyen made offerings with Secret Antidotes and that this is why the kingdom grew during his rule.

It is also stated that Trinyen was buried at Donkhorda, the site of the royal tombs, to the right of his father Thothori's tomb.

Regnal titles
Preceded by Thothori Nyantsen	King of Tibet; 512–537	Succeeded by Drongnyen Deu
