= Gungsong Gungtsen =

(Disputed) Tsenpo of the Tibetan Empire

Gungsong Gungtsen གུང་སྲོང་གུང་བཙན་
- Tsenpo

King of Tibet
- Reign: 635 – 640
- Predecessor: Songtsen Gampo
- Successor: Songtsen Gampo
- Lönchen: Nyang Mangpoje Shangnang
- Born: 622; Tashi Zhelyékhang, Lhasa, Tibet
- Died: 640 (aged 17–18); Lhasa, Tibet
- Burial: Gungchen Gungri Mausoleum, Valley of the Kings
- Spouse: Azhaza Mongjé Trikar
- Issue: Mangsong Mangtsen
- Dynasty: Yarlung
- Father: Songtsen Gampo
- Mother: Mongza Tricham

Gungsong Gungtsen (622 – 640) was a king of the Tibetan Empire from 635 until his death in 640, and the only known son of Songtsen Gampo, the 33rd King of Tibet.

== Early life ==
Gungtsen was born in 622 C.E in Lhasa, Tibet during his father Songtsen Gampo's reign.

== Biography ==
Gungsong Gungtsen was born to Mongza Tricham (Wylie: mang bza' khri lcham, mang bza' khri mo mnyen ldong steng), the noble woman from the Mang or Mong clan of Tölung (Wylie: stod lung), a valley to the west of Lhasa.

If Gungsong Gungtsen was married and had a son before 641, he was most probably born sometime before 625.

He is traditionally said to have been born at a nine-storied palace known as the "Celestial Auspicious Mansion of Draglha", built by Bhrikuti to the south of Lhasa. It is said that a shrine and a stupa were then built by his father on a rocky mountain near Yerpa which resembled a seated image of Tara.

Accounts say that when Gungsong Gungtsen reached the age of thirteen, his father Songtsen Gampo, retired. This corresponds to the period when he learned Tibetan grammar and worked on the Tibetan constitution. Gungsong Gungtsen also married Azhaza Mongjé Trikar when he was thirteen and they had a son, Mangsong Mangtsen (r. 650-676 CE).

Gungsong Gungtsen would have only ruled for five years when he died at the age of eighteen. His father, Songtsen Gampo, took the throne again. He is said to have been buried at Donkhorda, the site of the royal tombs, to the left of the tomb of his grandfather Namri Songtsen (gNam-ri Srong-btsan). The dates for these events are unclear. Written records of the actual enthronement ceremony of Gungsong Gungtsen are said to be scant.
