= Yarlung =

Yarlung can refer to:

- Yarlung Kingdom, see also: Tibetan Empire
- Yarlung dynasty, see also: List of emperors of Tibet
- Yarlung Valley, formed by the Yarlung River and refers especially to the district where it joins with the Chongye River, and broadens out into a large plain about 2 km wide, before they flow north into the Yarlung Tsangpo River or Brahmaputra
- Yarlung River, also called Yarlung Tsangpo River, a river in Tibet and upper course of the Brahmaputra
