= Tibetan calendar =

Tibetan Lunisolar calendar

Today (at UTC+00)
- Thursday, 29 October 2026
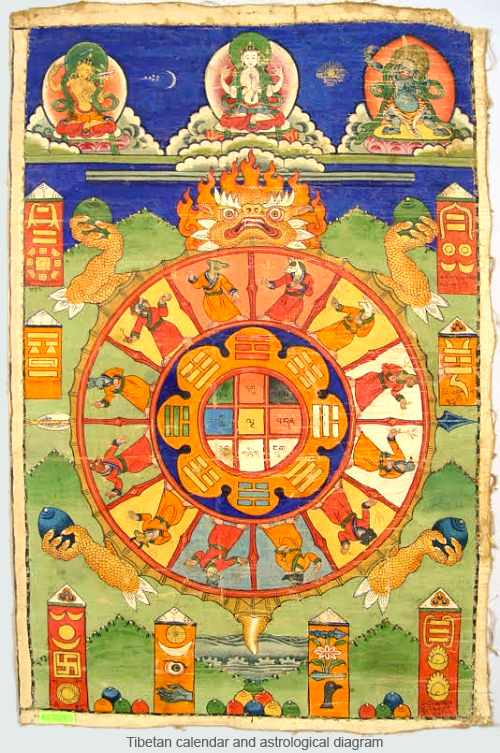
- Spaho སྲིད་པ་ཧོ་, (srid pa ho), used to invoke good fortune and ward off evil spirits, since it depicts the Five Elements, Eight Trigrams, Nine Grades, and Twelve Signs of the Zodiac which apprehend all the attributes of the world
- Tibetan: 19 tha skar, me pho rta 2153 or 1772 or 1000
Other calendars
Akan	Kuruyaw
Armenian	11 Trē 1476
Aztec	Atlcahualo 7, 7 Xōchitl
Babylonian	16 Tashritu, 2337 SE
Balinese pawukon	Menga, Pasah, Laba, Wage, Paniron, Wraspati of Watugunung, Brahma, Urungan, Suka
Bengali	13 Kartik, BS 1433
Chinese	Yang Fire Rat・Legs Mansion; Fire Horse Year, Month 9, Day 20 (Shuangjiang, 9 days until Lidong)
Common Era	29 October 2026 CE
Coptic	19 Paopi, AM 1743
Egyptian	16 Phamenoth, 2775 NE
Ethiopian	19 Ṭeqemt, 2019 Amätä Məhrät
French Republican	Décade I, Septidi de Brumaire de l'Année 235 de la République
Gregorian	29 October, AD 2026
Hebrew	18 Cheshvan, AM 5787
Hindu	Rohiṇi・Varīyas; Solar: 12 Kārtika, 1948 SE; Lunisolar: Caturthī, Kṛishna pakṣa of Āśvina, 2083 VE; Rāudra・5127 KY・1,872,877
Icelandic	Fimmtudagur, 6 Gormánuður 2026
Islamic	17 Jumada al-awwal, AH 1448 (using tabular method)
ISO week date	2026-W44-4
Japanese	19 Nagatsuki, Reiwa 8 (Sōkō, 9 days until Rittō)
Julian	16 October, AD 2026 (AM 7535)
Julian day	2461343
Korean	19 Gaedal, 4359 DE
Maya	13.0.14.1.0; 13 Zac, 7 Ahau
Roman	ante diem XVII Kalendas Novembres, MMDCCLXXIX AUC
Solar Hijri	7 Aban, SH 1405

The Tibetan calendar (Tibetan: ལོ་ཐོ, Wylie: lo-tho), or the Phukpa calendar, known as the Tibetan lunar calendar, is a lunisolar calendar composed of either 12 or 13 lunar months, each beginning and ending with a new moon. A thirteenth month is added every two or three years, so that an average Tibetan year is equal to the solar year. The 15th century Phukpa calendar is the main Tibetan calendar, and the Karma Kagyu's Tsurluk calendar is also in current use. The Tibetan New Year celebration is Losar (Tibetan: ལོ་གསར་, Wylie: lo-gsar), which falls either in the months of February or March in the Gregorian calendar.

During the Tibetan Empire period, the Tibetan calendar was a seasonally based calendar before the Buddha Shakyamuni's Kalachakra calendar system, a blend of both the Indian zodiac and Chinese zodiac systems, was incorporated. The Tibetan calendar is the basis of the Mongolian calendar, and the first day of Losar also aligns with the third Mongolian (Hor) month in other almanacs.

Every month, certain dates in the Tibetan calendar have special significance for Tibetan Buddhist practices, as do certain months of the Tibetan calendar year when the anniversaries of events from Shakyamuni Buddha's life correspond, such as Saga Dawa of the Tibetan fourth month.

== Years ==
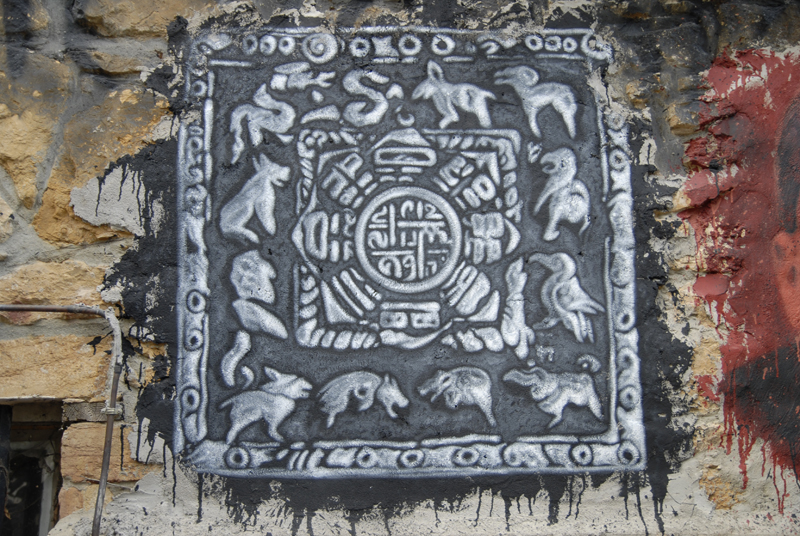
12 zodiac symbol

There were different traditions of naming years (Tibetan: ལོ་, Wylie: lo) in Tibet. From the 12th century onwards, we observe the usage of two sixty-year cycles. The 60-year cycle is known as the Bṛhaspati cycle and was first introduced into Tibet by an Indian Buddhist by the name of Chandranath and Tsilu Pandit in 1025 CE. The first cycle is the rabjyung (Tibetan: རབ་བྱུང༌།, Wylie: rab byung) cycle. The first year of the first rabjyung cycle started in 1027. This cycle was adopted from India. The second cycle was derived from China and was called Drukchu kor (Tibetan: དྲུག་ཅུ་སྐོར།, Wylie: drug cu skor, Chinese: 甲子). The first year of the first Drukchu kor cycle started in 1024. The cycles were counted by ordinal numbers, but the years within the cycles were never counted but referred to by special names. The structure of the drukchu kor was as follows: Each year is associated with an animal and an element, similar to the Chinese zodiac. Animals have the following order:

Hare	Dragon	Snake	Horse	Sheep	Monkey	Bird	Dog	Boar	Rat	Ox	Tiger
ཡོས་ yos	འབྲུག་ 'brug	སྦྲུལ་ sbrul	རྟ་ rta	ལུག་ lug	སྤྲེ་ spre	བྱ་ bya	ཁྱི་ khyi	ཕག་ phag	བྱི་བ་ byi.ba	གླང་ glang	སྟག་ stag

Elements have the following order:

Fire	Earth	Iron	Water	Wood
མེ་ me	ས་ sa	ལྕགས་ lcags	ཆུ་ chu	ཤིང་ shing

Each element is associated with two consecutive years, first in its male aspect (pho), then in its female aspect (mo). For example, a male Earth-Dragon year is followed by a female Earth-Snake year, then by a male Iron-Horse year. The sex may be omitted, as it can be inferred from the animal.

The element-animal designations recur in cycles of 60 years (a sexagenary cycle), starting with a (male) Wood-Rat year. These large cycles are numbered, the first cycle starting in 1024. Therefore, 2005 roughly corresponds to the (female) Wood-Rooster year of the 17th cycle. The first year of the sixty-year cycle of Indian origin (1027) is called rab-byung (same name as the designation of the cycle) and is equivalent to the (female) fire-Rabbit year.

Year (Gregorian)	Year according to rabjyung	Wylie	Element	Animal	Sex
2008	rabjyung 17 lo 22	sa pho byi	Earth	Rat	male
2009	rabjyung 17 lo 23	sa mo glang	Earth	Ox	female
2010	rabjyung 17 lo 24	lcags pho stag	Iron	Tiger	male
2011	rabjyung 17 lo 25	lcags mo yos	Iron	Hare	female
2012	rabjyung 17 lo 26	chu pho 'brug	Water	Dragon	male
2013	rabjyung 17 lo 27	chu mo sbrul	Water	Snake	female
2014	rabjyung 17 lo 28	shing pho rta	Wood	Horse	male
2015	rabjyung 17 lo 29	shing mo lug	Wood	Sheep	female
2016	rabjyung 17 lo 30	me pho spre	Fire	Monkey	male
2017	rabjyung 17 lo 31	me mo bya	Fire	Bird	female
2018	rabjyung 17 lo 32	sa pho khyi	Earth	Dog	male
2019	rabjyung 17 lo 33	sa mo phag	Earth	Boar	female
2020	rabjyung 17 lo 34	lcags pho byi	Iron	Rat	male
2021	rabjyung 17 lo 35	lcags mo glang	Iron	Ox	female
2022	rabjyung 17 lo 36	chu pho stag	Water	Tiger	male
2023	rabjyung 17 lo 37	chu mo yos	Water	Hare	female
2024	rabjyung 17 lo 38	shing pho 'brug	Wood	Dragon	male
2025	rabjyung 17 lo 39	shing mo sbrul	Wood	Snake	female
2026	rabjyung 17 lo 40	me pho rta	Fire	Horse	male
2027	rabjyung 17 lo 41	me mo lug	Fire	Sheep	female

=== Years with cardinal numbers ===
Three relatively modern notations of cardinal numbers are used for Tibetan years.

On Tibetan banknotes from the first half of the 20th century cardinal numbers can be seen, with year 1 in 255 CE, which is a reference to the legendary 28th Emperor of Tibet, Thothori Nyantsen.

Since the second half of the 20th century another year notation has been used, where the year of, for example, 2026 CE coincides with the Tibetan year of 2153. This relatively modern year notation is referred to as Bö Gyello (bod rgyal lo). In this era the first year is 127 BCE, dated to the legendary progenitor of the Yarlung dynasty, Nyatri Tsenpo.

In Tibetan calendars of the second half of the 20th century and on Tibetan coins cardinal year numbers are found with the indication of raplo, where the first year coincides with the first year of the rabjyung-cycle, that is 1027. Rab lo 928, for example, is the year of 1954 on the western Gregorian calendar.

Year (Gregorian)	Epoch 127 BCE	Epoch 255	Epoch 1027
From about February/March 2019	2146	1765	993
From about February/March 2020	2147	1766	994
From about February/March 2021	2148	1767	995
From about February/March 2022	2149	1768	996
From about February/March 2023	2150	1769	997
From about February/March 2024	2151	1770	998
From about February/March 2025	2152	1771	999
From about February/March 2026	2153	1772	1000

== Months ==
During the time of the Tibetan Empire (7th – 9th century) Tibetan months (Tibetan: ཟླ་བ་, Wylie: zla ba, THL: dawa) were named according to the four seasons:

First spring month (dpyid zla ra ba), middle spring month (dpyid zla 'bring po), last spring month (dpyid zla mtha' chung),
first summer month (dbyar zla ra ba), middle summer month (dbyar zla 'bring po), last summer month (dbyar zla mtha' chung),
first autumn month (ston zla ra ba), middle autumn month (ston-zla 'bring-po), last autumn month (ston zla mtha' chung),
first winter month (dgun zla ra ba), middle winter month (dgun-zla 'bring-po) and last winter month (dgun zla mtha' chung).

From the 12th century onwards each month has been named by the 12 animals of the Chinese zodiac:

stag, (Tiger), yos (Hare), brug (Dragon), sbrul (Snake), rta (Horse), lug (Sheep), sprel (Monkey), bya (Bird), khyi (Dog), phag (Boar), byi ba (Rat), and glang (Ox).

With the introduction of the calendar of the Kalacakratantra in the second half of the 11th century, months were also named via lunar mansions within which, roughly speaking, a full moon took place each month:

1st: Chu (mchu, Skt. māgha)
2nd: Wo (dbo, Skt. phālguna)
3rd: Nagpa (nag pa, Skt. caitra)
4th: Saga (sa ga, Skt. vaiśākha)
5th: Nön (snron, Skt. jyeṣṭha)
6th: Chutö (chu stod, Skt. āṣāḍha)
7th: Drozhin (gro bzhin, Skt. śrāvaṇa)
8th: Trum (khrums, Skt. bhādrapada)
9th: Takar (tha skar, Skt. āśvina)
10th: Mindrug (smin drug, Skt. kārttika)
11th: Go (mgo, Skt. mārgaśīrṣa)
12th: Gyal (rgyal, Skt. pauṣa)

In the second half of the 13th century the famous ruler Drogön Chögyal Phagpa introduced the system of counting the month by ordinal numbers, the so-called Hor "Mongolian" month:

1st Hor month (hor-zla dang-po) 2nd Hor month (hor-zla gnyis-pa) 3rd Hor month (hor-zla gsum-pa) 4th Hor month (hor-zla bzhi-pa) 5th Hor month (hor-zla lnga-pa) 6th Hor month (hor-zla drug-pa)	7th Hor month (hor-zla bdun-pa) 8th Hor month (hor-zla brgyad-pa) 9th Hor month (hor-zla dgu-pa) 10th Hor month (hor-zla bcu-pa) 11th Hor month (hor-zla bcu-gcig-pa) 12th Hor month (hor-zla bcu-gnyis-pa)

All these systems of counting or naming months were used up to modern times.

== Days ==
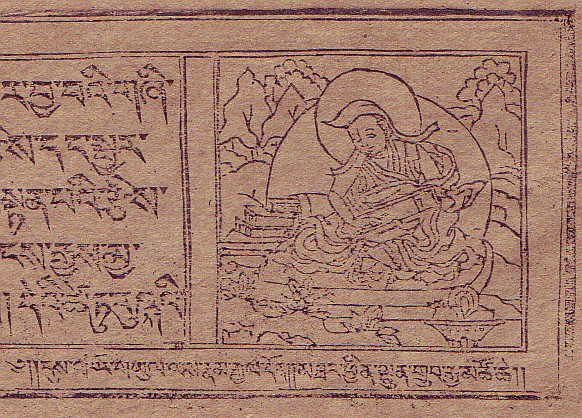
Phugpa Lhündrub Gyatsho, a Tibetan Calendar and Calculations Pooja

There are three different types of days (zhag), the khyim zhag, the tshes zhag and the nyin zhag.

The first two of these days are astronomical days. The time needed for the mean Sun to pass through one of the twelve traditional signs of the zodiac (the twelve khyim) is called khyim zla (solar month). One-thirtieth of one solar month (khyim zla) is one khyim zhag, which might be called a zodiacal day, because there is no equivalent name in Western terminology.

The time needed by the Moon to elongate 12 degrees from the Sun and every 12 degrees thereafter is one tithi (tshes zhag, "lunar day"). The lengths of such lunar days vary considerably due to variations in the movements of the Moon and Sun.

Thirty lunar days form one lunar or synodic month (tshes zla), the period from new moon to new moon. This is equal to the time needed for the Moon to elongate 360 degrees from the Sun (sun to sun). The natural day (nyin zhag) is defined by Tibetans as the period from dawn to dawn. Strictly speaking, the months appearing in a Tibetan almanac, called by us Tibetan calendar months, are not the same as lunar or synodic months (tshes zla), which can begin and end at any time of day. In Tibetan, there is no special term for a calendar month containing whole days. These calendar months are just called zla ba (month).

A Tibetan calendar month normally starts with the week day or natural day (gza' or nyin zhag) in which the first tithi (tshes zhag) ends. A Tibetan calendar month normally ends with the week day or natural day (gza' or nyin zhag) in which the 30th tithi (tshes zhag) ends. In consequence, a Tibetan calendar month (zla ba) comprises 29 or 30 natural days. In the sequence of natural days or week days, there are no omitted days or days that occur twice. But since these days are also named by the term tshes together with a cardinal number, it happens that certain numbers or dates (the corresponding tithi) do not occur at all (chad) or appear twice (lhag). The tithi are counted from 1 to 30 and it can happen that a Monday with the lunar day number 1 (tshes gcig) is followed by a Tuesday with the moon day number 3 (tshes gsum). On the other hand, a Monday with the lunar day number 1 (tshes gcig) may be followed by a Tuesday with the lunar day number 1 (tshes gcig). In other words, it happens quite often that certain dates do not appear in the Tibetan almanac and certain dates occur twice. But there are no natural days or week days that occur twice or which are omitted.

The days of the week (Tibetan: གཟའ, Wylie: gza') are named for astronomical objects.

Day	Tibetan (Wylie)	Phonetic transcription	Object
Sunday	གཟའ་ཉི་མ་ (gza' nyi ma)	nyima	Sun
Monday	གཟའ་ཟླ་བ་ (gza' zla wa)	dawa	Moon
Tuesday	གཟའ་མིག་དམར་ (gza' mig dmar)	Mikmar	Mars
Wednesday	གཟའ་ལྷག་པ་ (gza' lhak pa)	Lhakpa	Mercury
Thursday	གཟའ་ཕུར་བུ། (gza' phur bu)	Purbu	Jupiter
Friday	གཟའ་པ་སངས་ (gza' pa sangs)	Pasang	Venus
Saturday	གཟའ་སྤེན་པ་ (gza' spen ba)	Penba	Saturn

Nyima "Sun", Dawa "Moon" and Lhakpa "Mercury" are common personal names for people born on Sunday, Monday or Wednesday respectively.

== History ==
During the time of the Tibetan Empire, the twelve months were named according to the four seasons of the year, and the year started in spring.

Tibetans historically used the Indian astrological system, Tib. kar rtsis, that divided the days into rhythms defined by the elements and the constellations, and later used a Chinese astrological system, Tib. byung rtsis, which focuses on twelve animals and the five elements to describe patterns of events. The Indian and Chinese systems were joined by the Buddha's teachings found within the Sutra Avatamsakra and the Tantra Kalachakra to develop the Tibetan astrological calendar.

Beginning in the 12th century, the years were named after the 12 animals common in the Chinese zodiac.

The translation of the Kalachakra Tantra in the late 11th century CE marked the beginning of a change of Tibet's calendar. This tantra references the Indian astronomical calendar system with its calculations that follow the progression of the constellations - the five planets, and the sun and moon eclipses.

As the original teachings of the Kalacakra were taught by the Buddha himself, two hundred years later, the Kalacakra calendar was officially adopted as a Tibetan calendar by the Ü-Tsang king Drogön Chögyal Phagpa, in the second half of the 13th century.

A distinct Tibetan calendar was developed in 1284 by the lineage of the Gyalwang Karmapas, the Tsurphu tradition calendar. This Tsurluk calendar is based on the 3rd Karmapa, Rangjung Dorje's astrological treatise called The Compendium of Astrology (Tib. rtsis kun bsdus pa), a treatise from which many later treatises authored by the subsequent Karmapas and by Jamgon Kongtrul the Great evolved. The Tsurluk calendar is still overseen by Tsipa Gelek Dhargay, at the 17th Karmapa, Ogyen Trinley Dorje's seat in Rumtek, Sikkim, India.

In 1447, a Tibetan astrologer Phukpa Lhündrub Gyatso composed an astrological treatise called The Oral Teachings of Pundarika (Tib. pad dkar zhal lung). His work founded the Phukpa calendar which is the main calendar of Tibet. This main Tibetan calendar, the Phukpa, was modified many times during the subsequent centuries, and it remains a luni-solar calendar.

== See also ==
- Buddhist calendar
- Horology

== Primary sources ==
- (Sanskrit) Kalacakratantra. (Tibetisch) mChog gi dang-po sangs-rgyas las phyung-ba rgyud kyi rgyal-po dus kyi 'khor-lo.
- Grags-pa rgyal-mchan: Dus-tshod bzung-ba'i rtsis-yig
- sde-srid Sangs-rgyas rgya-mtsho: Phug-lugs rtsis kyi legs-bshad mkhas-pa'i mgul-rgyan vaidur dkar-po'i do-shal dpyod-ldan snying-nor
- karma Nges-legs bstan-'jin: gTsug-lag rtsis-rigs tshang-ma'i lag-len 'khrul-med mun-sel nyi-ma ñer-mkho'i 'dod-pa 'jo-ba'i bum-bzang

== Secondary sources ==
- Svante Janson, Tibetan Calendar Mathematics
- Norbu, Thubten & Harrer, Heinrich (1960). Tibet Is My Country. London: Readers Union, Rupert Hart-Davis.
- de Körős; Alexander Csoma (1834). A Grammar of the Tibetan Language. Calcutta.
- Henning, Edward (2007). Kalacakra and the Tibetan Calendar. Treasury of the Buddhist Sciences. NY: Columbia University Press. p. 408. ISBN 978-0-9753734-9-1.
- Laufer, Berthold (1913). The Application of the Tibetan Sexagenary Cycle. T´oung Pao, Vol. 14, pp. 569–596.
- Petri, Winfried (1966). Indo-tibetische Astronomie. Hohe Naturwissenschaftliche Fakultät (Habilitationsschrift for venia legendi in History of the Natural Sciences). Munich: Ludwig-Maximilians-Universität München.
- Pelliot, Paul (1913). Le Cycle Sexagénaire dans la Chronologie Tibétaine. Paris: Journal Asiatique 1, pp. 633–667.
- Schuh, Dieter (1973). Untersuchungen zur Geschichte der Tibetischen Kalenderrechnung. Wiesbaden: Steiner Verlag.
- Schuh, Dieter (1974). Grundzüge der Entwicklung der Tibetischen Kalenderrechnung. Zeitschrift der Deutschen Morgenländischen Gesellschaft, Supplement II. XVIII. Deutscher Orientalistentag vom 1. bis 5. Oktober 1972 in Lübeck. Vorträge, pp. 554–566.
- Tsepon W.D. Shakabpa (1967). Tibet: A Political History. New Haven and London: Yale University Press.
- Tournadre, Nicolas & Sangda Dorje (2003). Manual of Standard Tibetan: Language and Civilization. trans. Ramble, Charles. Ithaca: Snow Lion Publications. ISBN 1-55939-189-8.
- Yamaguchi, Zuiho (1973). Chronological Studies in Tibet. Chibetto no rekigaku: Annual Report of the Zuzuki Academic foundation X, pp. 77–94.
- Yamaguchi, Zuiho (1992). The Significance of Intercalary Constants in the Tibetan Calendar and Historical Tables of Intercalary Month. Tibetan Studies: Proceedings of the 5th Seminar of the International Association for Tibetan Studies, Vol. 2, pp. 873–895: Narita.
