= Mangsong Mangtsen =

2nd Tibetan Emperor and 35th King of Tibet (636–676)

Mangsong Mangtsen མང་སྲོང་མང་བཙན
- Tsenpo

King of Tibet
- Reign: 649 – 676
- Predecessor: Songtsen Gampo
- Successor: Tridu Songtsen
- Lönchen: list Gar Tongtsen Yülsung; Omade Lotsen; Gar Tsenye Dompu; Gar Trinring Tsendro
- Born: Mang-slon; 636; Tibet
- Died: 676 (aged 39–40); Tsanggi Barnanggang, Tibet (modern Bainang County)
- Burial: 679; Ngozhé Hrelpo Mausoleum, Valley of the Kings
- Spouse: Droza Trimalö
- Issue: Tridu Songtsen
Regnal name
- Tri Mangsong Tsen (ཁྲི་མང་སྲོང་བཙན)
- Dynasty: Yarlung dynasty
- Father: Gungsong Gungtsen
- Mother: Azhaza Mongjé Trikar
- Religion: Tibetan Buddhism

Mangsong Mangtsen (Tibetan: མང་སྲོང་མང་བཙན, Wylie: mang srong mang btsan) (636 – 676), also known as Trimang Löntsen or Khri-mang-slon-rtsan, was the 35th King (Tsenpo) of Tibet from 650 to 676. He succeeded to the throne after the death of his grandfather Songtsen Gampo.

As Songtsen Gampo's only son Gungsong Gungtsen had died early, he was succeeded by his infant grandson Mangsong Mangtsen. The political power was left in the hands of the prime minister (Lönchen) Gar Tongtsen.

== Political and military activities ==
Relations between China and Tibet began to sour during this reign as he began to expand into the Tang territory. In 658, Mangsong "again" sent presents to Emperor Gaozong asking for a princess to marry, but this request was refused.

He then consolidated Tibet's hold over the whole of the Tibetan plateau controlling both the Azha in the east and Zhang Zhung in the west. However, by 658 China had gained control of both Khotan and Kucha and established protectorates as far as Sogdia and Kashmir.

Sometime prior to 662, Mangsong had allied himself with the Western Turks and together they began raiding the Chinese protectorates. They attacked Kashgar in 663, and Khotan in 665. In 667, the Turkic Nushibi of the Onoq submitted to Tibet, which also controlled the strategic Wakhan valley.

Between 665 and 670, Khotan was defeated by the Tibetans, and a long string of conflicts ensued with China. In the spring of 670, Tibet attacked the remaining Chinese territories in the western Tarim Basin. With troops from Khotan they conquered Aksu, upon which the Chinese abandoned the region, ending two decades of Chinese control. They thus gained control over all of the Chinese Four Garrisons of Anxi in the Tarim Basin in 670 and held them until 692, when the Chinese finally managed to regain these territories.

== Death and succession ==
According to the Tibetan Annals, Mangsong Mangtsen died in 676 but some sources say the Tibetans kept the death a secret for three years so that the Chinese would not be aware they were without a leader. The Chinese record his death in 679. He was buried in the royal burial grounds near Yarlung.

He was followed by his young son, Tridu Songtsen, also known as Dusong. The Tang Annals say Dusong was eight years old (i.e. nine years old by Western reckoning) in 679. He was, therefore, presumably born in 670. Due to his young age, he was enthroned with the chief minister Gar Tongtsen's second son, Gar Trinring Tsendro, to act as regent.

== Footnotes ==
Regnal titles
Preceded by Songtsen Gampo	Emperor of Tibet r. 650–676	Succeeded by Tridu Songtsen
