= Gar Mangsham Sumnang =

General in the Tibetan Empire

Tibetan name
- Tibetan: མགར་མང་ཞམ་སུམ་སྣང་
Transcriptions
- Wylie: mgar mang zham sun snang
- THL: gar mang zham sum nang

Gar Mangsham Sumnang (Tibetan: མགར་མང་ཞམ་སུམ་སྣང་, Wylie: mgar mang zham sun snang; ? – ?) was a 7th-century ce general of the Tibetan Empire. He was active during Namri Songtsen's and Songtsen Gampo's reign.

The Lönchen Thonmyi Tringpo Gyaltsennu tried to overthrow Namri Songtsen, and was detected by him. Sumnang set a trap together with another general khu khri snya dkru' zung, captured him, and cut off his head by sword.

He served as high minister during Songtsen Gampo's reign. After Nyang Mangpoje's execution, he was appointed as Lönchen, and later turned to another general Khyungpo Pungse.

Political offices
| Preceded by Nyang Mangpoje Shangnang | "Lönchen" of Tibet ? – ? | Succeeded by Khyungpo Pungse Sutse |
