= List of kings of Tibet =

List of kings of Tibet can refer to:

- List of rulers of Tibet
- List of emperors of Tibet
