= Nyang Mangpoje Shangnang =

General in the Tibetan Empire

Tibetan name
- Tibetan: མྱང་མང་བོ་རྗེ་ཞང་སྣང་
Transcriptions
- Wylie: myang mang po rje zhang snang
- THL: nyang mang bo jé zhang nang

Nyang Mangpoje Shangnang (Tibetan: མྱང་མང་བོ་རྗེ་ཞང་སྣང་, Wylie: myang mang po rje zhang snang; ? – ?) was a general of the Tibetan Empire who served as Lönchen during Emperor Songtsen Gampo's reign.

The Tibetan emperor Namri Songtsen was assassinated in 618. The young prince Songtsen Gampo came to the throne, and appointed Mangpoje as his regent. At that time, Tibet faced rebellion in its vassal kingdoms. It proved that Mangpoje was an excellent leader. He quickly put down the rebellion, captured all the mutineer leaders and put them to death. Then, he led a number of men in an invasion of the Sumpa, defeated them with very few casualties, and forced them to surrender. Tibet began to collect taxes in Sumba, and Mangpoje had very high reputation in Tibet.

Songtsen realised Mangpoje could be a threat to his central authority. Another famous general, Khyungpo Pungse, noticing this, sowed discord among them. Pungse told Mangpoje that Songtsen meant to purge him, persuaded him to return to his own castle sbu ba and refuse to go to the capital. Then Pungse spread rumors that Mangpoje plotted rebellion. Songtsen was taken in; he sank the sbu ba castle, captured Mangpoje, and had Mangpoje executed. His castle was torn down, and his position turned over to Gar Mangsham Sumnang.

Political offices
Preceded by Gar Tridra Zimun	"Lönchen" of Tibet ? – ?	Succeeded by Gar Mangsham Sumnang
