= Nyatri Tsenpo =

First king of Tibet

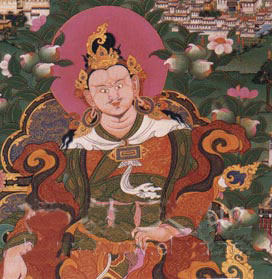

King of Tibet
- Reign: 127 BC – ???
- Successor: Mutri Tsenpo
- Dynasty: Yarlung

Tibetan name
- Tibetan: གཉའ་ཁྲི་བཙན་པོ་
Transcriptions
- Wylie: gnya' khri btsan po

Chinese name
- Traditional Chinese: 聶赤贊普
- Simplified Chinese: 聂赤赞普
Transcriptions
Standard Mandarin
- Hanyu Pinyin: Nièchì Zànpǔ
- Wade–Giles: Nieh^{4}-ch'ih^{4} Tsan^{4}-p'u^{3}

Nyatri Tsenpo (Tibetan: གཉའ་ཁྲི་བཙན་པོ་, lit. 'Neck-Enthroned King') was the first king of Tibet and a legendary progenitor of the Yarlung dynasty. Although stories of his origin vary, most describe him as an outsider whom the Tibetans accepted as their king because of his physical abnormalities and strength.

Tibetan Buddhist sources generally describe him as having had webbed hands, with one account stating he was an Indian prince with the additional deformity of eyelids closing from the bottom rather than from the top. More recent Tibetan Buddhist sources describe him as a descendant of the Shakya clan. The Dunhuang manuscripts give Nyatri Tsenpo a divine origin, stating that he was a sky god who descended from heaven to rule Tibet after seeing its natural beauty. Nonetheless, all accounts conclude the story of his origin with the Tibetans carrying him on their necks and shoulders and giving him the Tibetan name "Nyatri Tsenpo", which means "Neck-Enthroned King".

The start of his reign is traditionally placed at 127 BC, which marks the first year of the Tibetan calendar. According to Tibetan mythology, Nyatri Tsenpo constructed the first Tibetan building, Yungbulakang Palace. At the end of his reign, Nyatri Tsenpo is said to have ascended or returned to heaven by climbing a rope. Losar, the Tibetan New Year, is celebrated in his honour.

== Origin ==
There are conflicting stories about the origin and mortality of Nyatri Tsenpo. His place of origin has been variously claimed to be Tibet, India, China, or heaven.

In the pre-Buddhist, indigenous Bon religion, it is traditionally held that the early kings of Tibet were gods who had descended from heaven to rule the people of earth. The Dunhuang manuscripts state that Nyatri Tsenpo was a god of the sky who, upon seeing the natural beauty of Tibet, descended from heaven onto the sacred mountain Yarlha Shampo to rule over the land. He made his way down the valley where he met a group of Tibetans, whom he impressed with his beauty, charisma, and power. The Tibetans asked him where he had come from due to his physical appearance, which differed from the Tibetans'. Unable to speak the Tibetan language, he responded by pointing to the sky, which the Tibetans interpreted as a confirmation of his divinity. Believing the encounter to be fated, the Tibetans lifted him onto their necks and shoulders (in some accounts using a yoke) and made him their king, giving him the Tibetan name "Nyatri Tsenpo", which means "Neck-Enthroned King".

Tibetan Buddhist sources give a similar account of Nyatri Tsenpo's origin but portray him as a prince who had arrived from India, possibly to strengthen his ties to Buddhism or the Buddha himself. Buddhist canons differ as to his exact lineage, and he has been variously described as a descendant of Bimbisara of Magadha, Prasenajit of Kosala, or Udayana of Vatsa. One story claims Nyatri Tsenpo was a son of Udayana who was born with multiple physical deformities, including "unusual marks", webbed hands, and eyelids closing from the bottom instead of the top. He was thrown into the Ganges in a box and rescued by peasants, but he ran away to the Himalayas after coming of age. A similar story says he was the only son of a king in eastern India who, upon seeing his deformities, ordered that he be killed. However, nobody was brave enough to kill him and he was instead placed inside a brass jar and thrown into the Ganges. He was later discovered by a farmer who raised him in the forest until he came of age; upon hearing of his true origin, he ran away until he reached Tibet. More recent Tibetan Buddhist sources claim Nyatri Tsenpo was a descendant of the Shakya clan, sometimes a Shakya princess who had fled to Tibet.

Alternatively, Changkya Rolpai Dorje, an 18th-century Tibetan Buddhist teacher in the Qing court, recorded that Nyatri Tsenpo was originally a mortal named Wubera. He was the youngest of nine sons born to a woman named Chamotsun from Powo (present-day Bomê County, Tibet Autonomous Region). Wubera was said to be handsome and strong but cursed with webbed hands, which frightened the other townspeople. He was consequently banished from his hometown when he came of age, and wandered the Himalayas until he met a group of Tibetans. The Tibetans were convinced of Wubera's divinity due to his physical abnormalities and strength, and asked him to be their king. Wubera accepted and was subsequently lifted onto the Tibetans' necks and shoulders and given the name "Nyatri Tsenpo". Some Chinese-language historical documents follow a similar narrative but claim Nyatri Tsenpo had arrived from China proper, but this account has been discredited even by Chinese scholars.

== Reign ==
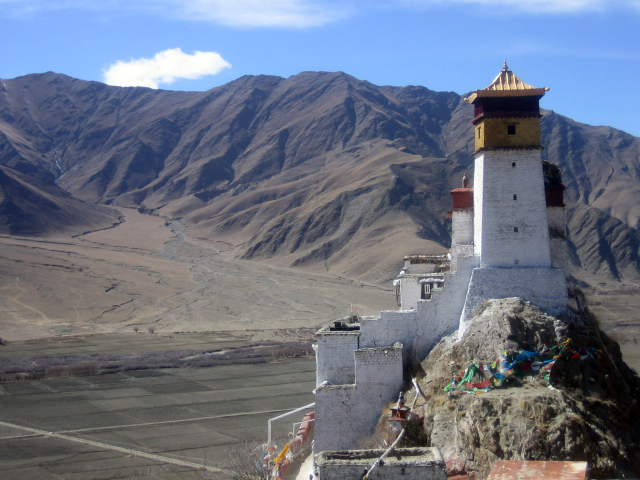
Yungbulakang Palace, purportedly the first Tibetan building and the seat of the Yarlung dynasty

According to Tibetan sources, Nyatri Tsenpo began his reign in 127 BC (Wood-Tiger year in the Tibetan calendar). Some sources record 127 BC as the year of his birth, while others state he was born in 115 BC (Fire-Tiger year).

Seeing that the Tibetans lived in caves, Nyatri Tsenpo built the first Tibetan building, Yungbulakang Palace, which became the royal seat of the Yarlung dynasty started by Nyatri Tsenpo.

Followers of Bon and Tibetan Buddhism both revere Nyatri Tsenpo and the six kings who followed him as divine and immortal beings. In Tibetan mythology, it is said that the first seven kings of Tibet, upon completing their respective reigns, returned to heaven by climbing a rope dropped from the skies. The eighth king, Drigum Tsenpo, lost his immortality because a minister he had quarreled with named Longam cursed him with magic and cut the rope between heaven and earth. Drigum Tsenpo was subsequently assassinated by Longam and became the first Tibetan king to be entombed.

== Legacy ==
The year of Nyatri Tsenpo's enthronement marks the first year of the Tibetan calendar. Losar, the Tibetan New Year, is celebrated in his honour.
