= Eastern Queendom =

Eastern Queendom during Tang era

Eastern Queendom or Dongnüguo (Chinese: 東女國 , lit. "Eastern Kingdom of Women"), also known as the Supi (蘇毗) Kingdom or Tangmao (唐旄) Kingdom, is the name of an ancient kingdom reportedly ruled by women. The Eastern Queendom was a matrilineal society located on the Qinghai-Tibet Plateau and existed from the Northern and Southern Dynasties to the Tang Dynasty in China. Modern ethnicities of the Sino-Tibetan Marches that still yield traces of matrilineal customs, such as the Mosuo and Zhaba, are thought to be the cultural descendants of this Eastern Queendom.

The Eastern Queendom was about 800 kilometers long from north to south (a 22-day trip) and about 360 kilometers from east to west (a 9-day trip). There were queens and deputy queens in the territory, who were served by "virtuous women 賢女" within the realm. The queen lived in a nine-story watchtower, and the common people live in a four- or five-story watchtower. Volume 197 of the "Old Book of Tang" "Biography of Southern Barbarians and Southwest Barbarians 南蠻西南蠻傳" records: "Eastern Queendom, a different species of Western Qiang, has a queendom in the West Sea (Western Queendom 西女國), so it is called Eastern Queendom 東女國. It is customary to regard women as kings. To the east is Maozhou, it is connected to Dangxiang, connected to Yazhou 雅州 in the southeast, and separated from Luonuman 羅女蠻 and Bailangyi 白狼夷."

== List of Rulers ==
- Sūpímòjié (蘇毗末羯) (late 6th century)
- Dájiǎwǎ (达甲瓦) (early 7th century)
- Qìbāngsūn (弃邦孙) (early 7th century) – the state became a vassal state of the Tibetan Empire
- Tāngpāngshì (湯滂氏) (early 7th century)
- Liǎnbì (斂臂) (late 7th century)
- Éyǎn'ér (俄琰儿) (end of 7th century)
- Zhàoyèfū (趙曳夫) (mid-8th century) – after her reign, the state was thereafter ruled by male monarchs
- Molingzan (沒陵贊) (mid-8th century) – the king of Supi, who sought to submit his state to the Tang Empire, but was killed by the Tibetans
- Tānglìxī (湯立悉) (end of 8th century)
