= Songtsen Gampo =

1st Tibetan Emperor and 33rd King of Tibet (d.650)

Songtsen Gampo སྲོང་བཙན་སྒམ་པོ
- Tsenpo
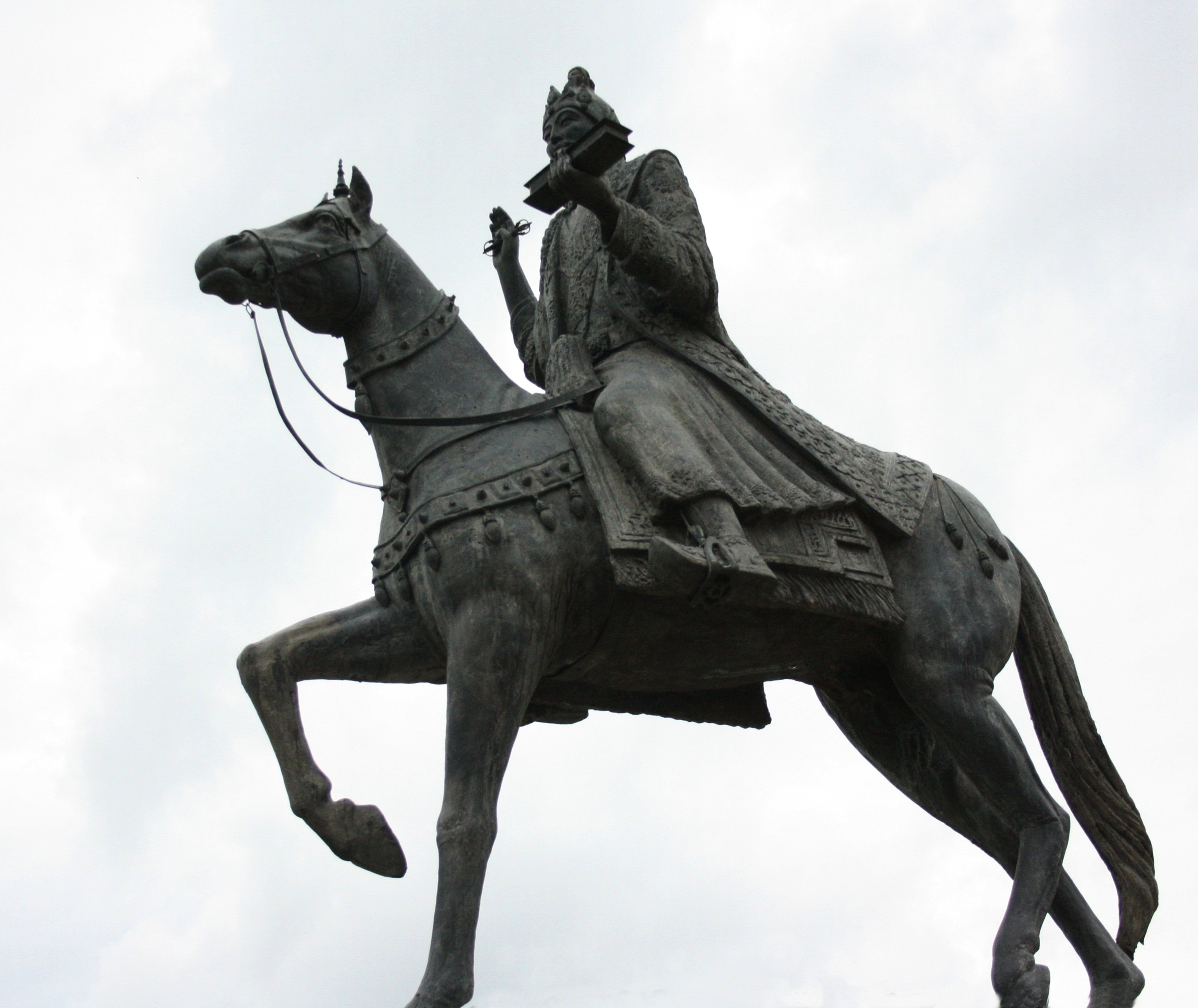
- Statue of King Songtsen Gampo on horseback in front of the Songtsen Library in Dehradun, India

King of Tibet
- Reign: 618/629 – 650
- Predecessor: Namri Songtsen
- Successor: Mangsong Mangtsen
- Co-monarch: Gungsong Gungtsen (635–640)
- Lönchen: list Nyang Mangpoje Shangnang; Gar Mangsham Sumnang; Khyungpo Pungse Sutse; Gar Tongtsen Yülsung
- Born: Songtsen ? Maizhokunggar, Tibet (modern day Maizhokunggar County, Tibet Autonomous Region, China)
- Died: 650; Zelmogang, Penyül, Tibet (modern day Lhünzhub County, Tibet Autonomous Region, China)
- Burial: Muri Mukpo Mausoleum, Valley of the Kings
- Consorts: Belmoza Tritsün; Gyamoza Münchang; Minyakza Gyelmotsün; Litikmen; Mongza Tricham
- Issue: Gungsong Gungtsen
Regnal name
- Khri Songtsen Gampo
- Tibetan
- Wylie transliteration: Srong-btsan sGam-po
- THL: Songtsen Gampo
- Dynasty: Yarlung
- Father: Namri Songtsen
- Mother: Driza Thökar
- Religion: Tibetan Buddhism

Songtsen Gampo (Tibetan: སྲོང་བཙན་སྒམ་པོ, Wylie: srong btsan sgam po) was the 33rd King (Tsenpo) of Tibet from 618 or 629 until his death in 650, and the founder of the Tibetan Empire. (Note: Tibetan: བོད, Wylie: bod; Chinese: 吐蕃; pinyin: Tǔbō/Tǔfán; Wade–Giles: T'u^{³}-po^{¹}/T'u^{³}-fan^{²}) The first of the "Three Dharma Kings of Tibet", he formally introduced Buddhism to Tibet and built the Jokhang, under the influence of his queen Bhrikuti, from the Licchavi kingdom of Nepal. He unified the Tibetan Plateau, conquered lands adjacent to Tibet, and moved the capital to the Potala Palace in Lhasa.

His queen mother is identified as Driza Thökar (Tibetan: འབྲི་བཟའ་ཐོད་དཀར་, Wylie: 'bri bza' thod dkar). The exact date of his birth and his enthronement are not certain, and in Tibetan history it is generally accepted that he was born in an Ox year of the Tibetan calendar. According to Tsepon W. D. Shakabpa, he ascended the throne at age thirteen, in 614, and reigned at least until 648.

As Tibetan kings usually ascended to the throne around age 13, several earlier dates are also suggested for the birth of Songtsen Gampo include 569, 593 or 605.

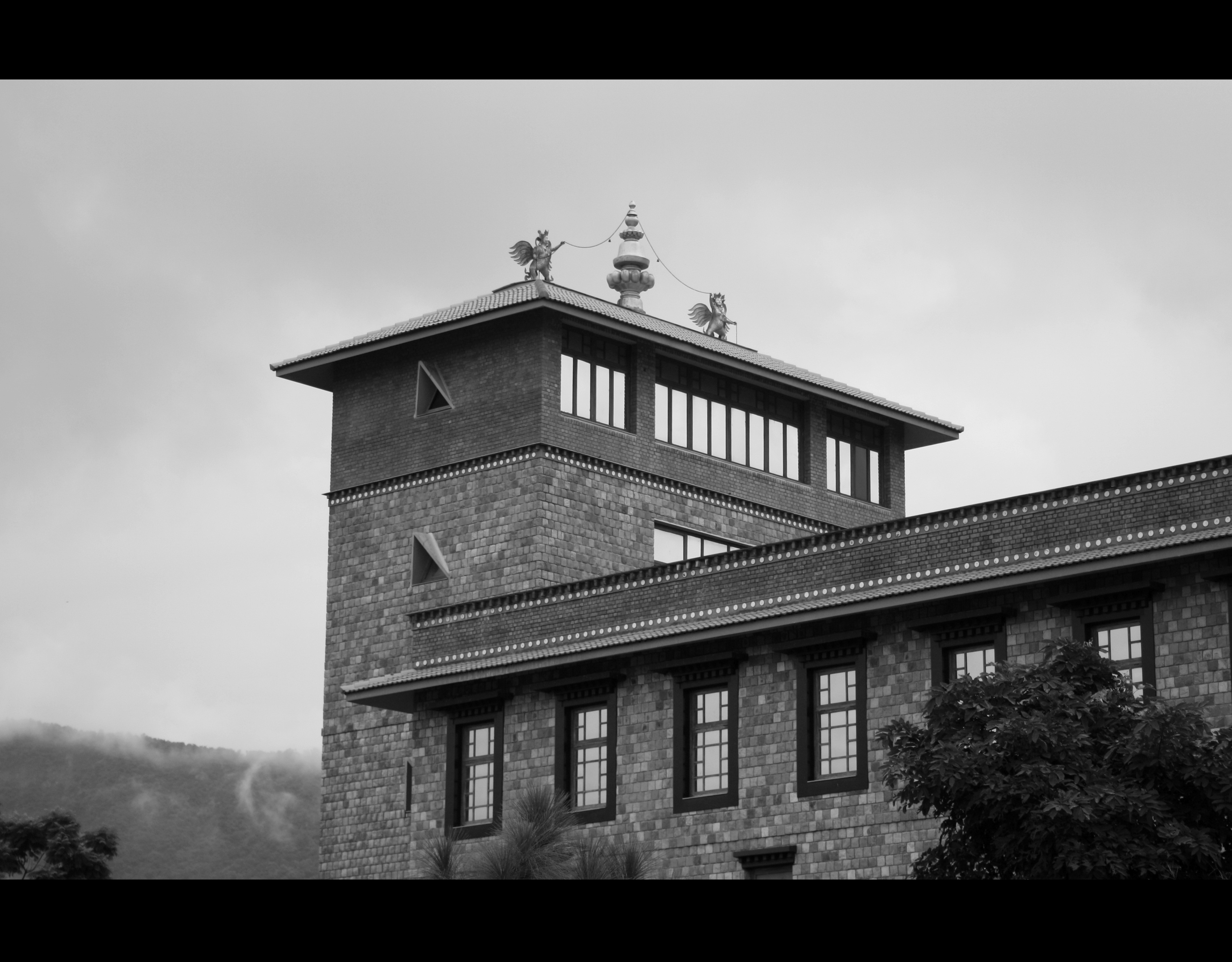
The Songtsen Library in Dehradun, India, collects, preserves and makes accessible ancient Tibetan and Himalayan religious, cultural and historical documents.

According to traditional beliefs, his legendary minister Thonmi Sambhota was credited for creating the Tibetan script and Classical Tibetan, the first literary language of Tibet. However, it is difficult to verify the historical existence of Thönmi Sambhoṭa, and the legend of his invention of the Tibetan script which is in any case now usually seen as developing later.

== Early life and cultural background ==
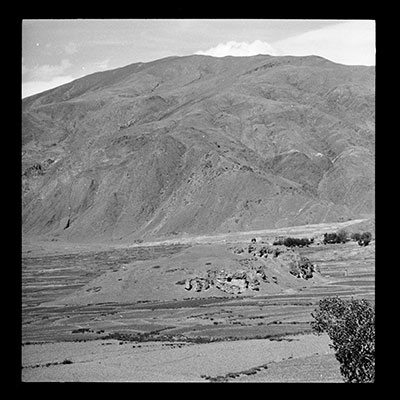
The burial mound of Songtsen Gampo surrounded by cultivated fields (Chyongye Valley, 1949)

It is said that Songtsen Gampo was born at Gyama in Meldro, a region to the northeast of modern Lhasa, the son of the Yarlung king Namri Songtsen. The book The Holder of the White Lotus says that it is believed that he was a manifestation of Avalokiteśvara, of whom the Dalai Lamas are similarly believed to be a manifestation. His identification as a cakravartin and incarnation of Avalokiteśvara began in earnest in the indigenous Buddhist literary histories of the 11th century.

=== Family ===
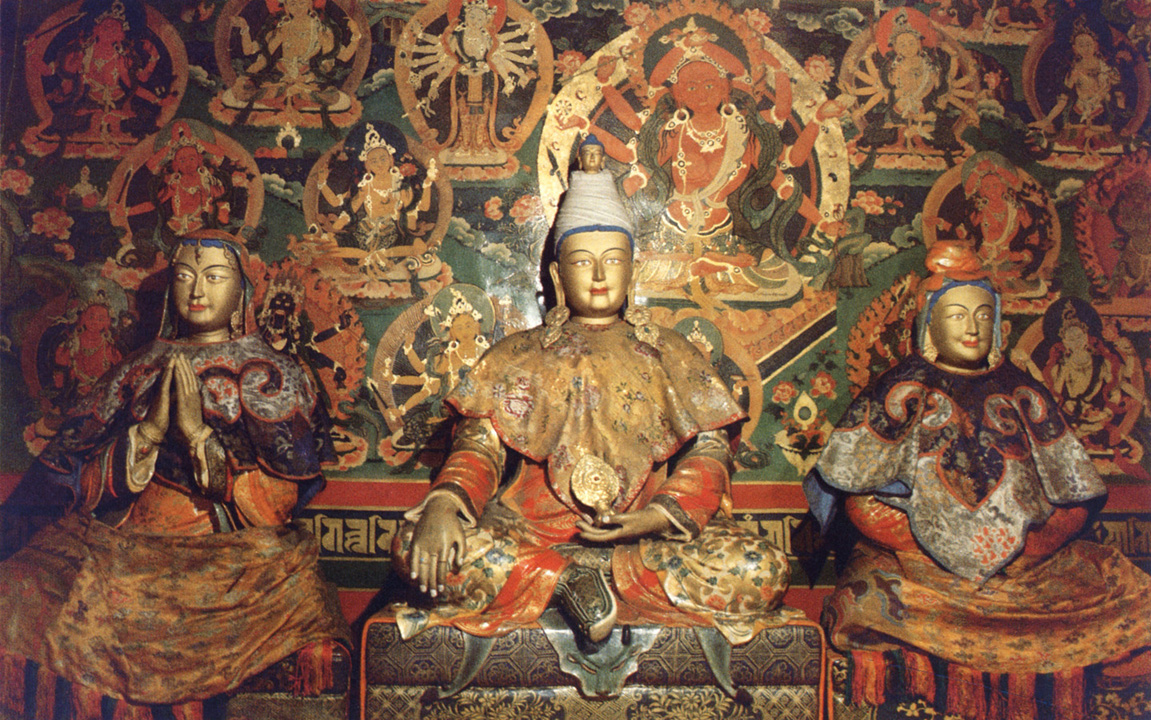
Songtsen Gampo (center), Bhrikuti Devi of Nepal (left) and Princess Wencheng (right)

Songtsen Gampo's mother, the queen, was a member of the prominent Tsépong clan (Wylie: tshe spong, Tibetan Annals Wylie: tshes pong), which played an important part in the unification of Tibet. Her name is recorded variously but is identified as Driza Tökar ("the Bri Wife named White Skull Woman", Wylie: 'bri bza' thod dkar, Tibetan Annals Wylie: bring ma tog dgos).

Songtsen Gampo had six consort queens, of whom four were Tibetan and two were foreign born. The highest-ranking consort was Pogong Mongza Tricham (Wylie: pho gong mong bza' khri lcam, also called Mongza, "the Mong clan wife", who is said to have been the mother of Gungsong Gungtsen. Other notable wives include a noble woman of the Western Xia known as Minyakza ("Western Xia wife", Wylie: mi nyag bza'), and a noble woman from Zhangzhung. Well-known even today are his two foreign wives: the Nepali princess Bhrikuti ("the great lady, the Nepalese wife", Wylie: bal mo bza' khri btsun ma) as well as the Chinese Princess Wencheng ("Chinese Wife", Wylie: rgya mo bza'). Songtsen sponsored the building of two temples to house the images of Buddha brought by his Nepalese and Chinese wives, however he showed little interest in propagating Buddhism otherwise, and was buried according to pre-Buddhist protocols and rituals when he died.

Songtsen Gampo's heir, Gungsong Gungtsen, died before his father, so his younger son Mangsong Mangtsen inherited the throne. Two Dunhuang sources give different mothers for Mangsong Mangtsen: the Tibetan Annals say the mother was the Tsenmo (Princess Wencheng) of Songtsen while the Genealogy says it was Mangmoje Trikar Wylie: mang mo rje khri skar). It is unlikely that the mother was the Tsenmo because the Annals did not use the honorific kinship term yum (mother) for her.

Tibetan Empire-era documents found at Dunhuang say that Songtsen Gampo also had a sister Sad-mar-kar (or Sadmarkar) and a younger brother bTzan-srong who was betrayed and died in a fire, c. 641. According to one partially damaged scroll from Dunhuang, there was hostility between Sadmarkar and bTzan-srong, who was then forced to settle in gNyal (southeast of the Yarlung River and across the 5,090 metres (16,700 ft) Yartö Tra Pass, which borders on modern Bhutan, and Arunachal Pradesh in India).

When the prince Gungsong Gungtsen reached the age of thirteen (twelve by Western reckoning), his father, Songtsen Gampo, retired, and the prince ruled for five years, which could have corresponded to the period when Songtsen Gampo was working on a new Tibetan constitution. Gungsong Gungtsen is also said to have married 'Azha Mang-mo-rje when he was thirteen, and they had a son, Mangsong Mangtsen (r. 650–676 CE). Gungsong Gungtsen is said to have only ruled for these five years and died at eighteen. Songtsen Gampo, returned to the throne. Gungsong Gungtsen is said to have been buried at Donkhorda, the site of the royal tombs, to the left of the tomb of his grandfather Namri Songtsen (gNam-ri Srong-btsan). According to Tibetan tradition, Songtsen Gampo was enthroned while still a minor as the thirty-third king of the Yarlung dynasty after his father was poisoned circa 618. He is said to have been born in an unspecified Ox year and was 13 years old (12 by Western reckoning) when he took the throne. This accords with the tradition that the Yarlung kings took the throne when they were 13, and supposedly old enough to ride a horse and rule the kingdom. If these traditions are correct, he was probably born in the Ox year 605 CE. The Old Book of Tang notes that he "was still a minor when he succeeded to the throne."

The current head of the Royal House of Tibet and king in exile is a direct descendant of the Dharma kings and has been crowned King of Tibet by Tenzin Gyatso, 14th Dalai Lama. His Majesty King Lhagyari Trichen Namgyal Wangchuk lives in the United States and travels the world speaking out for the human and religious rights of the Tibetan people, under the occupation of the People's Republic of China.

=== Cultural accomplishments ===
Songtsen Gampo sent his minister Thonmi Sambhota and other young Tibetans to India to devise a script for Classical Tibetan, which led to the creation of the first Tibetan literary works and translations, court records and a constitution. After Thonmi Sambhota returned from India, he stayed in retreat at Kukhamaru Palace in Lhasa while creating the Tibetan script. He then presented the script to the court and taught the king. Songtsen Gampo then retired for four years to learn the written language, after which he translated twenty-one tantric texts on Avalokiteshvara, and the Mani Kumbum.

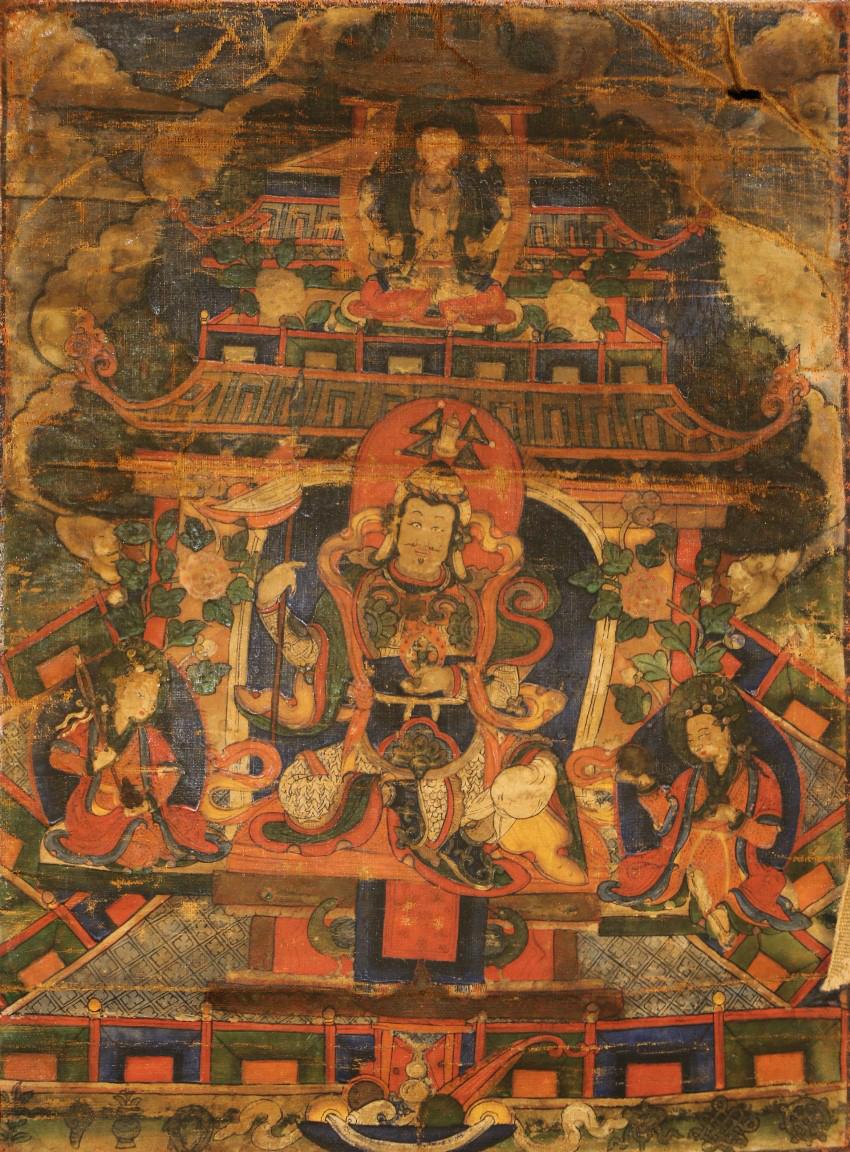
Tibetan Thangka with Songtsen Gampo, Wovensouls collection, Singapore

Songtsen Gampo moved the seat of his newly unified kingdom from the Yarlung Valley to the Kyichu Valley, site of the future city of Lhasa. The site itself was originally a herding ground called Rasa ("the place of goats") but the name was changed to Lhasa ("the place of gods") on the king's founding of the Jokhang Temple. The name Lhasa itself originally referred simply to the temple precincts.

He is also credited with bringing many new cultural and technological advances to Tibet. The Jiu Tangshu, or Old Book of Tang, states that after the defeat in 648 of an Indian army in support of Chinese envoys, the Chinese Emperor, Gaozong, a devout Buddhist, gave him the title variously written Binwang, "Guest King" or Zongwang, "Cloth-tribute King" and 3,000 rolls of multicoloured silk in 649 and granted the Tibetan king's request for "silkworms' eggs, mortars and presses for making wine, and workmen to manufacture paper and ink."

Traditional accounts say that, during the reign of Songtsen Gampo, examples of handicrafts and astrological systems were imported from China and the Western Xia; the dharma and the art of writing came from India; material wealth and treasures from the Nepalis and the lands of the Mongols, while model laws and administration were imported from the Uyghurs of the Second Turkic Khaganate to the North.

== Introduction of Mahayana Buddhism ==
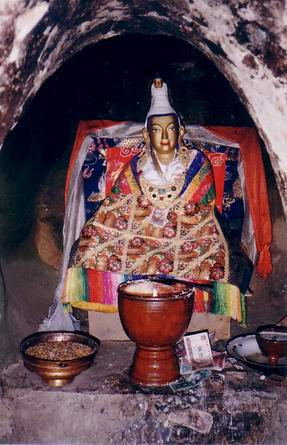
A statue of Songtsen Gampo in his traditional meditation cave at Yerpa

Songtsen Gampo is traditionally credited with being the first to bring Mahayana Buddhism to the Tibetan people. He is also said to have built many Buddhist temples, including the Jokhang in Lhasa, the city in which he is credited in one tradition with founding and establishing as his capital, and Tradruk Temple in Nêdong. During his reign, the translation of Buddhist texts from Sanskrit into Tibetan began.

Songtsen Gampo is considered to be the first of the three Dharma Kings (Wylie: chos rgyal) — Songtsen Gampo, Trisong Detsen, and Ralpachen — who established Buddhism in Tibet.

The inscription on the Skar cung Pillar (erected by Sadnalegs, who ruled c. 800–815) reports that during Songtsen Gampo's reign, "shrines of the Three Jewels were established by building the temple of Ra-sa [Lhasa] and so on." The first edict of Trisong Detsen mentions a community of monks at this vihara.

== 620s ==
Songtsen Gampo was adept at diplomacy as well as on the field of battle. The king's minister, Nyang Mangpoje Shangnang, with the aid of troops from Zhangzhung, defeated the Sumpa in northeastern Tibet circa 627 (Tibetan Annals [OTA] l. 2).

== 630s ==
Six years later (c. 632/633), Nyang Mangpoje Shangnang was accused of treason and executed (OTA l. 4–5, Richardson 1965). Minister Gar-Tongtsen succeeded him.

The Jiu Tangshu records that the first ever embassy from Tibet arrived in China from Songtsen Gampo in the 8th Zhenguan year, or 634 CE. Tang dynasty chronicles describe this as a tribute mission, but it brought an ultimatum demanding a marriage alliance, not subservient rituals. After this demand was refused, Tibet launched victorious military attacks against Tang affiliates in 637 and 638.

=== The conquest of Zhang Zhung ===
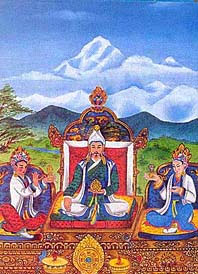
Emperor Songtsen Gampo with Princesses Wencheng and Bhrikuti

There is some confusion as to whether Central Tibet conquered Zhangzhung during the reign of Songtsen Gampo or in the reign of Trisong Detsen (r. 755 until 797 or 804 CE). The Old Book of Tang do seems to place these events clearly in the reign of Songtsen Gampo, for they say that in 634, Yangtong (Zhangzhung) and various Qiang peoples "altogether submitted to him." Following this, he united with the country of Yangtong to defeat the 'Azha, or Tuyuhun, and then conquered two more tribes of Qiang before threatening Songzhou with an army of (according to the Chinese) more than 200,000 men (100,000 according to Tibetan sources). He then sent an envoy with gifts of gold and silk to the Chinese emperor to ask for a Chinese princess in marriage and, when refused, attacked Songzhou. According to the Tang annals, he finally retreated and apologised, and, later, the emperor granted his request, but the histories written in Tibet some historical records in 11-16century said that the Tibetan army defeated the Chinese and that the Tang emperor delivered a bride under threat of force. The final result was that Tibet returned all the occupied land of the dependent countries of the Tang Dynasty. The princess of the Tang Dynasty married the leader of Tibet, and the two sides formed an alliance. The historical community generally believes that this is the result of mutual compromise. Tibet's expansion in the name of marrying a princess has not been realized, but it has married a princess.

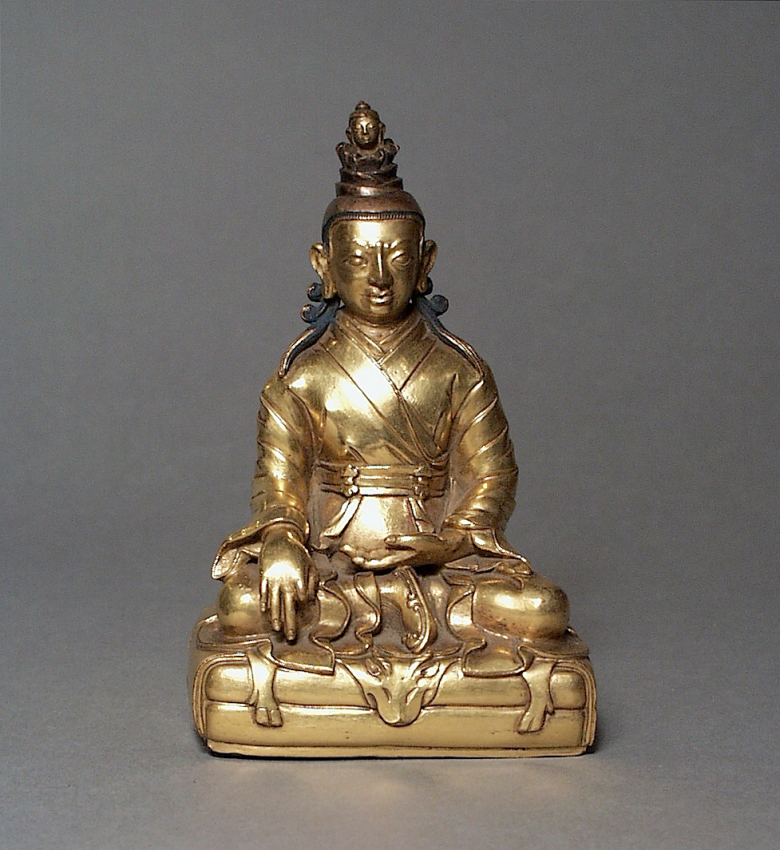
King Songtsen Gampo sculpture from Central Tibet, 17th century, gilt brass with traces of paint

Early Tibetan accounts say that the Tibetan king and the king of Zhangzhung had married each other's sisters in a political alliance. However, the Tibetan wife of the king of the Zhangzhung complained of poor treatment by the king's principal wife. War ensued, and, through the treachery of the Tibetan princess, "King Ligmikya of Zhangzhung, while on his way to Sum-ba (Amdo province) was ambushed and killed by King Songtsen Gampo's soldiers. As a consequence, The Zhangzhung kingdom was annexed to Bod [Central Tibet]. Thereafter the new kingdom born of the unification of Zhangzhung and Bod was known as Bod rGyal-khab." R. A. Stein places the conquest of Zhangzhung in 645.

=== Further campaigns ===
He next attacked and defeated the Tangut people (who later formed the Western Xia state in 942 CE), the Bailang, and Qiang tribes. The Bailan people were bounded on the east by the Tanguts and on the west by the Domi. They had been subject to the Chinese since 624.

After against China in the frontier province of Songzhou in 635–36 ,The final result was that Tibet returned all the occupied land of the dependent countries of the Tang Dynasty. The princess of the Tang Dynasty married the leader of Tibet, and the two sides formed an alliance. The historical community generally believes that this is the result of mutual compromise. Tibet's expansion in the name of marrying a princess has not been realized, but it has married a princess.

Around 639, after Songtsen Gampo had a dispute with his younger brother Tsensong (Wylie: brtsan srong), the younger brother was burnt to death by his own minister, Khasek (Wylie: mkha' sregs), possibly at the behest of the emperor.

== 640s ==
The Old Book of Tang records that when the king of 泥婆羅, Nipoluo ("Nepal"), the father of Licchavi king Naling Deva (or Narendradeva), died, an uncle, Yu.sna kug.ti, Vishnagupta) usurped the throne. "The Tibetans gave him refuge and reestablished him on his throne [in 641]; that is how he became subject to Tibet."

Sometime later, but still within the Zhenguan period (627–650 CE), the Tibetans sent an envoy to present day Nepal, where the king received him "joyfully", and, later, when a Tibetan mission was attacked in present-day India by then minister of emperor Harshavardhan who had usurped the throne after emperor Harshavardhan's death around 647 CE, the Licchavi king came to their aid. Songtsen Gampo married Princess Bhrikuti, the daughter of King Licchavi.

The Chinese Princess Wencheng, niece of the Emperor Taizong of Tang, left China in 640 to marry Songtsen Gampo, arriving the next year. Peace between China and Tibet prevailed for the remainder of Songtsen Gampo's reign.

Both wives are considered to have been incarnations of Tara (Standard Tibetan: Drolma), the Goddess of Compassion, the female aspect of Chenrezig, where "Dolma, or Drolma (Sanskrit means Tara). As Sarat Chaundra explains, the two wives of Emperor Songtsen Gampo are venerated under this name. The Chinese princess is called Dolkar, of 'the white Dolma,' and the Nepalese princess Doljang, or 'the green Dolma.' The latter is prayed to by women for fecundity."

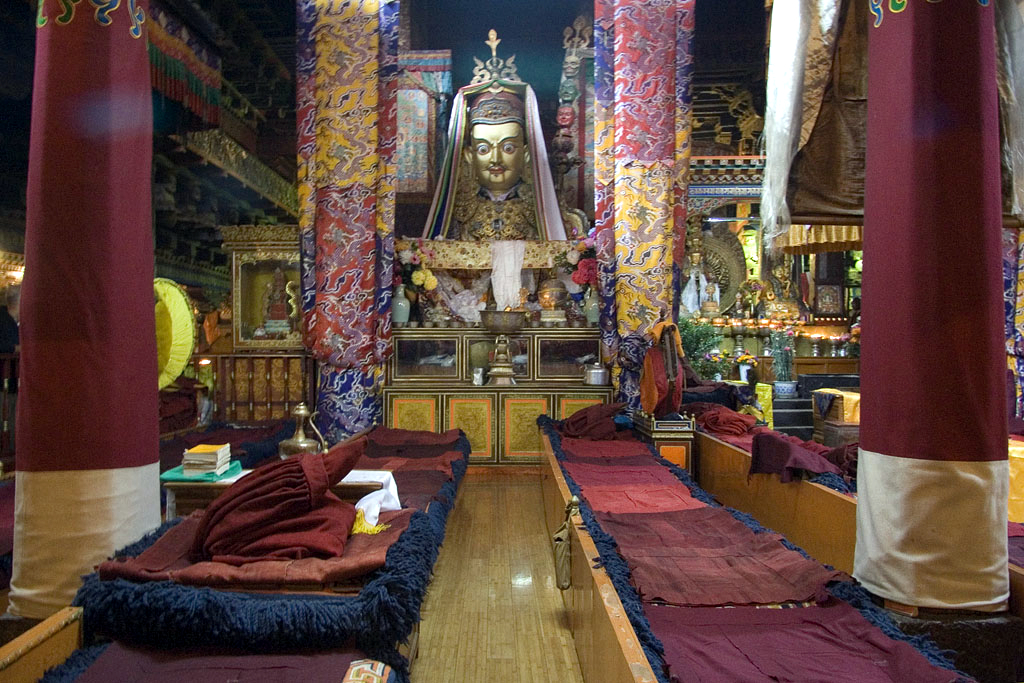
The Jokhang Temple, home of the most venerated statue in Tibet, the original complex built by this emperor

The Jiu Tangshu adds that Songtsen Gampo thereupon built a city for the Chinese princess, and a palace for her within its walls. According to Chinese sources, "As the princess disliked their custom of painting their faces red, Songtsen Gampo ordered his people to put a stop to the practice, and it was no longer done. He also discarded his felt and skins, put on brocade and silk, and gradually copied Chinese civilization. He also sent the children of his chiefs and rich men to request admittance into the national school to be taught the classics, and invited learned scholars from China to compose his official reports to the emperor."

However, according to Tibetologist John Powers, such accounts of Tibet embracing Chinese culture through Wencheng are not corroborated by Tibetan histories.

Songtsen Gampo's sister Sadmarkar was sent to marry Lig-myi-rhya, the king of Zhangzhung. However, when the king refused to consummate the marriage, she then helped Songtsen Gampo to defeat Lig-myi-rhya and incorporate the Zhangzhung of Western Tibet into the Tibetan Empire in 645, thus gaining control of most, if not all, of the Tibetan plateau.

Following the visit by the famous Chinese pilgrim monk Xuanzang to the court of Harsha, the king ruling Magadha, Harsha sent a mission to China which, in turn, responded by sending an embassy consisting of Li Yibiao and Wang Xuance, who probably travelled through Tibet and whose journey is commemorated in inscriptions at Rajagrha - modern Rajgir – and Bodhgaya.

Wang Xuanze made a second journey in 648, but he was badly treated by Harsha's usurper, his minister Arjuna, and Harsha's mission plundered. This elicited a response from Tibetan and Nepalese (Licchavi) troops who, together, soundly defeated Arjuna's forces at the Battle of Chabuheluo.

In 649, the King of Xihai Jun was conferred upon Songtsen Gampo by Tang Gaozong, the emperor of the Tang dynasty. At the same time, the Tang Gaozong granted him the title of Commandant-escort (son-in-law general) as well as the honorary title of Bin King, In his letters to the Tang emperor, Songtsen Gampo referred to himself as "a subject of the Tang." Tibet formally became a nominal vassal state of the Tang dynasty, until 670 AD when Tang and Tibet became hostile to each other again.

According to the Tibetan Annals, Songtsen Gampo must have died in 649, and, in 650, the Tang emperor sent an envoy with a "letter of mourning and condolences". His tomb is in the Chongyas Valley near Yalung, 13 metres high and 130 metres long.

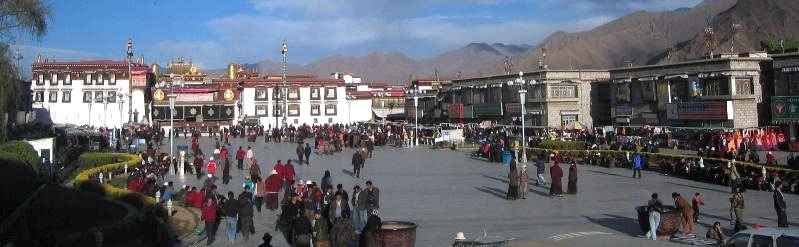
Jokhang as it stands today

== Historiography ==
Sources on Tibet sometimes confuse later Tibetan rulers with earlier ones, blending them together. Certain events and accomplishments taking place after Songtsen Gampo's reign have been chronicled as having occurred earlier than they actually did.

== Notes ==
Regnal titles
Preceded by Namri Songtsen	Emperor of Tibet; 605 or 617?–649	Succeeded by Mangsong Mangtsen
