= Sumpa =

Ancient people in Tibet

The Sumpa (Wylie: sum pa) were a tribe living in northeastern Tibet from ancient times. Chinese historical sources refer to them as "Qiang", a term for people living in what is now southwest China, and their actual ethnic identity is not known. Their territory was absorbed by the Tibetan Empire in the late 7th century, after which point they gradually lost their independent identity.

The Sumpa identified as the people known to the Chinese as the Supi (蘇毗) or Sunpo (孫波).

== Origins and territory ==
The Tangshu, chap. 221b, says that the people of the country of Supi (Sumpa) were originally of Western Qiang descent. The Qiang had been in the region for a very long time – they were the main foreign enemies of the Shang dynasty (c. 1600–1046 BCE). It has been suggested by Christopher I. Beckwith that their name may have derived from an Indo-European root meaning 'charioteer'.

After they were annexed by the Tibetans they took the name of Sunpo (= Sumpa). They were the largest of the tribes in the region and consisted of some 30,000 family units. Their territory extended from the border of the Domi people to the east as far as the Houmangxia (or Houmang Gorge) Pass in the west.

The location of the Supi/Sumpa kingdom in the 7th–8th centuries in northeastern Tibet stretched from the southern bank of the Yak River (Chinese: Tongtian River – known in Tibetan as the Chu-dmar, the largest upper course of the 'Bri-chu or Yangtze River) in the east about 1,400 li (roughly 452 km) southwest to the Houmangxia Pass (= the Ta-tsang-la) and ranged at times as far as Khotan.

The Sumpa were considered part of the Tibetan kingdom as early as the 6th century CE, in the time of Songtsen Gampo's father Namri Songtsen, and are thought to have spoken a Tibetan dialect.

== History ==
The Sumpa/Supi are associated with the Supiya of Kharosthi documents of about 300 CE from the Tarim Basin. They are described as being among the invaders of the Kingdom of Khotan ('the red-faced (Tibetans), Huns, Chinese, Supiya'). To the Khotanese, who had been a settled people for about a thousand years, they appeared as savage and uncouth. They are also mentioned as having been in Niya and Cherchen.

The Supi have also been closely associated with mysterious "Kingdoms of Women" during the Sui dynasty (581–617 CE). It is also known as Eastern Queendom 東女國. "A queen of the Suvarṇagotra in the western 女國 Niu-kuo [Pinyin: Nüguo] of women was called in Chinese Su-p'i, which may indicate a woman of the Supīya."

The Tibetan Annals record that the Tibetans took the territory of Śo-čhigs of the Sumpa in 692 and in 702 the Emperor Tridu Songtsen and his Council made an inspection of Sumpa territory. According to documents from Dunhuang the Advisor, Mangporje, brought "the whole country of the Sumpa under tribute" under Songtsen Gampo probably c. 627.

Although the original annexation of the Sumpa by the Tibetans appears to have been basically peaceful, and the Sumpa were gradually assimilated into the general Tibetan population, there were occasional tensions between the two groups. The Old Tibetan Chronicle says that Myang Mangporje advised Songtsen Gampo against attacking the Sumpa, who had been among his father Namri Songtsen’s feudatory states. "Instead he offered protection for their flocks, wherefore, in the words of the Chronicle, ‘all their households were naturally captured as subjects.’"

Along with the 'Asha (Tuyuhun) they were rapidly absorbed by the Yarlung dynasty during the 7th and 8th centuries CE. After their submission to the Tibetans from the Yarlung Valley, they were stationed in Minyak or modern Amdo, to guard the eastern frontier against the Chinese.

According to Tangshu 221b; during the Tianbao era (742–755), the Sumpa king, Molingzan, wanted to submit to the Chinese Empire with all his people, but he was killed by the Tibetans. His son Xinuo, accompanied by some dignitaries, sought refuge in Longyou in Gansu. The Governor sent them with an escort to the capital where the Emperor, Xuanzong (reigned 712–756 CE), treated them with great honours. The Xin Tangshu 216a places the submission of the son of the Supi king in 755. It gives his name as Xinuoluo and says that he was granted the title of Huaiyi ("he who cherishes justice") Prince, and was given the family name of Li. It adds, "The Supi are a powerful tribe."

Evidence from documents on woodslips found near modern-day Hotan shows that "Tibetan armies, including previously subjugated Sumpa and Zhangzhung elements" were stationed along the Southern Silk Route from the mid-eighth to mid-ninth century CE. A major administrative division or "horn" of Tibet (there were six altogether), was named "Sumpa-ru". It was in northeastern Tibet (Amdo) near Miran, and soldiers were sent from there to man camps at Mazar-tagh and Miran in the southern Tarim Basin.
