= Gyama Palace =

Archaeological site in Lhasa, Tibet

- Gyama Palace (Tibet)
- Type: Palace
- Location: Gyama Township, Maizhokunggar County, Lhasa, Tibet; 29.75916°N 91.67224°E

Gyama Palace or Gyama Mingyur Ling in Maizhokunggar County, Lhasa, Tibet, now ruined, was built by Namri Songtsen in the 6th century as the new capital of the expanding Tibetan Empire. His son, Songtsen Gampo, was born there but later moved the capital to Lhasa. The palace is now in ruins.

== History ==
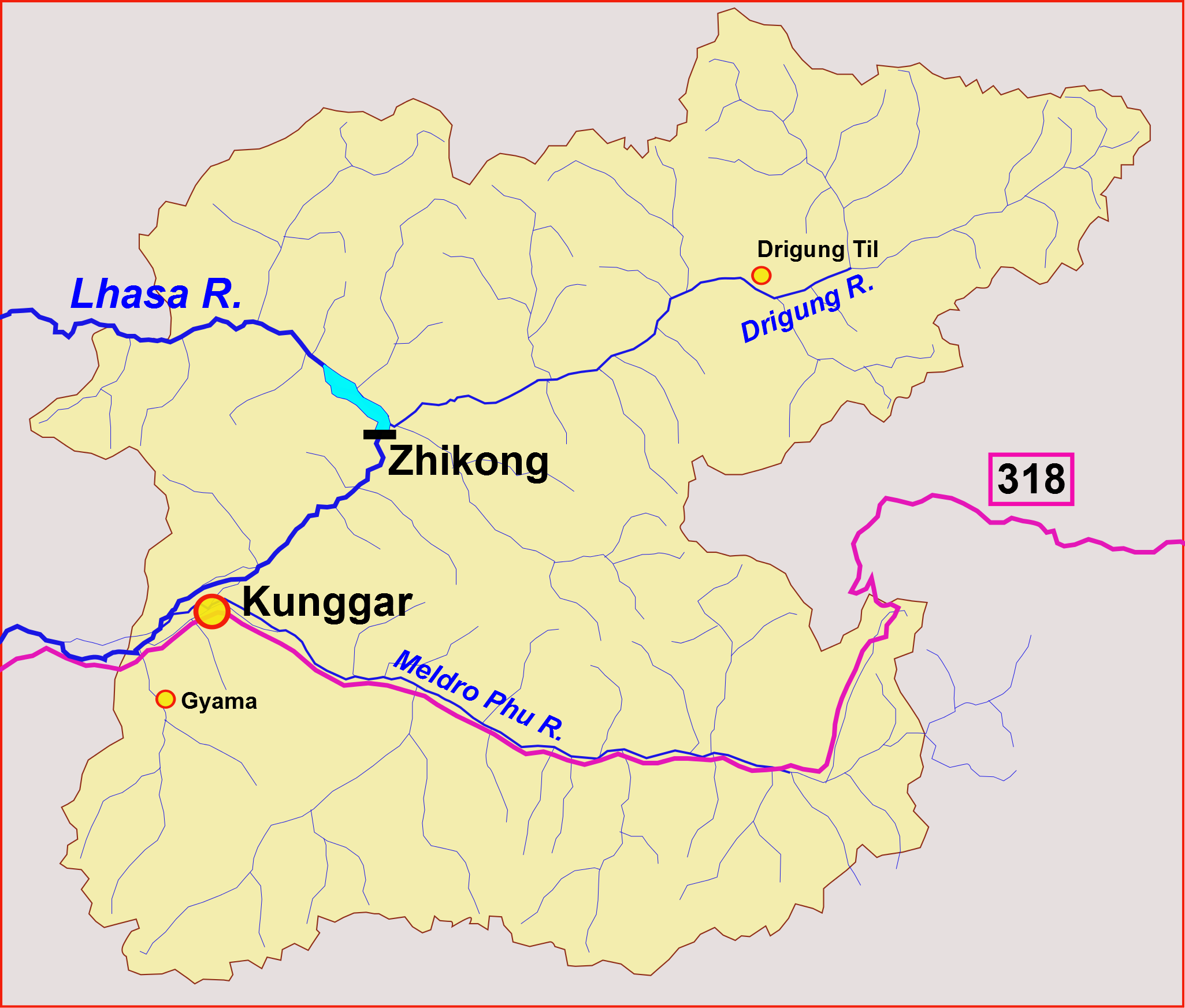
Gyama is in the southwest of Maizhokunggar County

The ruined Gyama Palace lies in the Gyama Valley in the south of Maizhokunggar County, Lhasa. It was built by Namri Songtsen in the 6th century after he had gained control of the area from Supi. Songtsen Gampo, his son, was born in the palace. Songtsen Gampo unified the Tibetan plateau and established the Tibetan Empire (629–846). He moved the capital of the kingdom to Lhasa, where he built the Potala Palace. The transfer took place in 633 AD.

== Location ==
The traces of the mountainside palace indicate that Gyama Palace was an impressive complex. Three more recent white pagodas mark Songtsen Gampo's birthplace. Gyama was the site of fierce battles against the Mongolian Güshi Khan, who had been invited to Tibet by the Gelug sect. Beside the palace there are ruins of various fortifications from the Yuan (1271–1368) and Ming (1368–1644) dynasties.

35 million yuan were spent between June 2008 and June 2010 to develop the Gyama scenic spot. It covers 470 mu, with an architectural complex that covers 7,800 square metres (84,000 sq ft).

== Sources ==
- An, Caidan (2003). Tibet China: Travel Guide. 五洲传播出版社. ISBN 978-7-5085-0374-5.
- "Concise Tibet History". China Culture. Archived from the original on 2015-07-24.
- Lethe, Guo (2012-11-12). "Gyama: birthplace of Songtsen Gampo". China Tibet Online. Archived from the original on 2015-02-15.
