= Zanam Zindé =

16th King of Tibet

Zanam Zindé was the sixteenth Tsenpo, one of the mythical kings of Tibet. According to the constitution, the functions of Dalun, Premier and Anben, responsible for collecting taxes and tributes are recorded as having been created by Zindé.
