= Yerpa =

Tibetan Buddhist monastery near Lhasa, Tibet, China

- Tibetan transcription(s); Tibetan: གཡེར་པ; Wylie transliteration: g•yer pa Pronunciation in IPA: [[jeːpa]] Official transcription (China): Yêrba; Chinese transcription(s); Traditional: 葉巴; Simplified: 叶巴; Pinyin: Yèbā
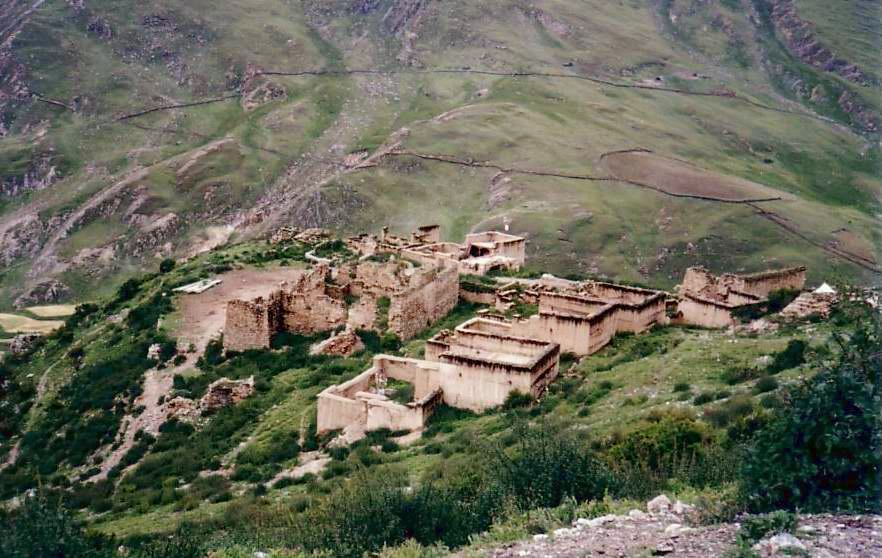
- Monastery ruins, 1993

- Location within Tibet Autonomous Region

Religion
- Affiliation: Tibetan Buddhism
- Sect: Gelug

Location
- Location: Yerpa Valley, Lhasa Prefecture, Tibet Autonomous Region, China
- Interactive map of Yerpa
- Coordinates: 29°44.87′N 91°16.83′E

Architecture
- Founder: Songtsen Gampo and Trisong Detsen
- Completed: 7th-8th century

Yerpa (also known as Brag Yer-pa, Drak Yerpa, Druk Yerpa, Dagyeba, Dayerpa and Trayerpa) is a monastery and a number of ancient meditation caves that used to house about 300 monks, located a short drive to the east of Lhasa, Tibet.

== Description ==
Dra Yerpa is located on a hillside in Dagzê County. The entrance to the Yerpa Valley is about 16 kilometres (9.9 mi) northeast of Lhasa on the northern bank of the Kyichu. From there, it is another 10 kilometres (6.2 mi) to the famous ancient meditation caves in the spectacular limestone cliffs of the Yerpa Valley (Tibetan: བྲག་ཡེར་པ་, Wylie: Brag Yer-pa). There is an ancient sky burial site opposite the main caves.

The famous legendary hero Gesar of Ling is said to have visited the valley. The holes his arrows left in the cliffs are believed to be evidence of his presence.

== History ==
=== Early years ===
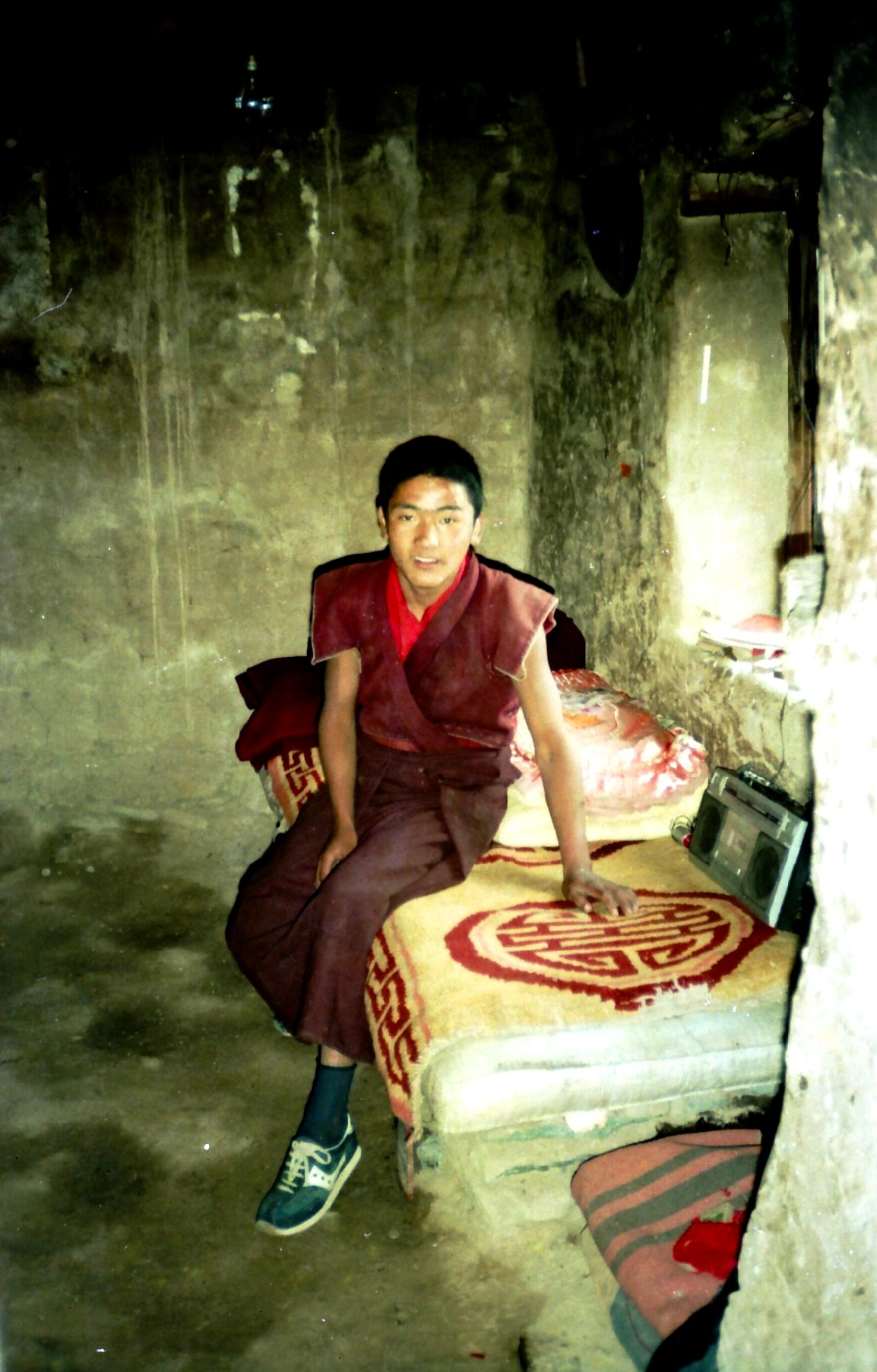
Young monk in meditation cell, Yerpa

There are a number of small temples shrines and hermitages and the cliffs contain some of the earliest known meditation sites in Tibet, some dating back to pre-Buddhist times. Among the more famous are those traditionally connected with Songtsen Gampo (604–650 CE), (traditionally the 33rd king of the Yarlung dynasty and first emperor of a united Tibet). His Tibetan queen, Monza Triucham, founded the Dra Yerpa temple here.

He and his two foreign-born queens are said to have meditated in the 'Peu Marsergyi Temple' and in the 'Chogyel Puk', and to have discovered 'self-originated' symbols of the Buddha-body, speech and mind. Padmasambhava, or Guru Rinpoche (late 8th to early 9th century), meditated and practiced tantric yoga with his yogini Yeshe Tsogyal here, and to have spent 7 months in meditation in the 'Dawa Puk', which is considered to be one of his three most important places of attainment. After Lhalung Pelgyi Dorje assassinated the anti-Buddhist Bon Emperor Langdarma in 842 CE he is said to have hidden himself in a cave and meditated for 22 years. His hat was kept there until 1959.

Yerpa became one of the three most important centres of meditation and retreat in Central Tibet. Several of Guru Rinpoche's disciples are also said to have meditated here. Atisha (982 – 1054 CE) preached extensively in the valley. Atisha's hermitage is in ruins but had 300 monks in the 19th century and was the summer quarters for the Ramoche Monastery (the Upper Tantric College).

Later histories record that both Songtsen Gampo and Trisong Detsen (756–797) founded temples at Yerpa, and Klu-mes Tshul-khrims did some refurbishing in the 11th century. Tradition says that after Songtsen Gampo's only son, Gungri Gungsten, was born to Mongza Tricham, Princess of Mang, one of his wives: "A shrine and a stupa dedicated to the tutelary deity of mother and son were built upon the lap of a rocky mountain that resembled a seated image of the Holy Tara in the region of Yerpa."

=== Gelug control ===
The ancient Kadampa gompa Yerpa Drubde passed to Gelug control after the reformation of Je Tsongkhapa (1357–1419). After the death of the 4th Dalai Lama (1589–1617), in 1618 the monks of the Gelug monasteries of Sera and Drepung revolted against the Tsangpa forces in Lhasa. Those who were not killed took refuge in Taglung, to the northeast. Khöntön Rinpoché, who had tried to persuade the monks of Sera to avoid violence, moved to Yerpa until calm returned. Yerpa lost its wealth at this time, and was placed under the jurisdiction of Taklung Monastery.

=== Recent years ===
There were some 300 monks living at Yerpa from at least the beginning of the 19th century until 1959. It also acted as summer residence for the Gyuto Lhasa Tantric College. The Drubde monastery, the summer residence of the Gyutö College, was destroyed in 1959. During the Cultural Revolution (1966–76) the whole complex at Yerpa, including the Drag Yerpa monastery and the Upper Tantric College summer residence, were completely destroyed.

Using voluntary labor and donations some of the cave temples and Drag Yerpa were later partially restored. Police came to Yerpa after the disturbances of October 1987 and pasted notices on the temple doors warning people against taking part in "counter-revolutionary activities". In 1998 the government demolished a number of chapels that had been built without authorization. The number of monks allowed at Yerpa was still strictly controlled in 2008.

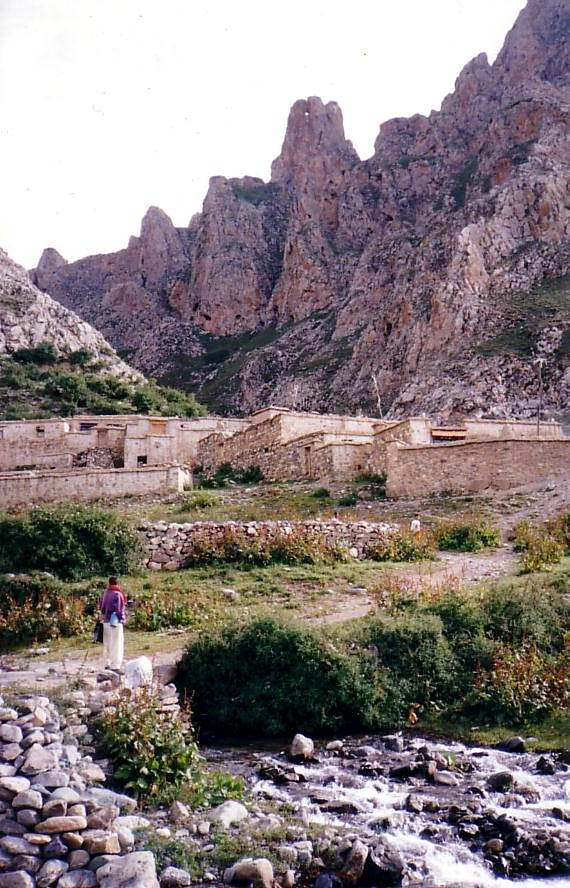
Yerpa, 1993

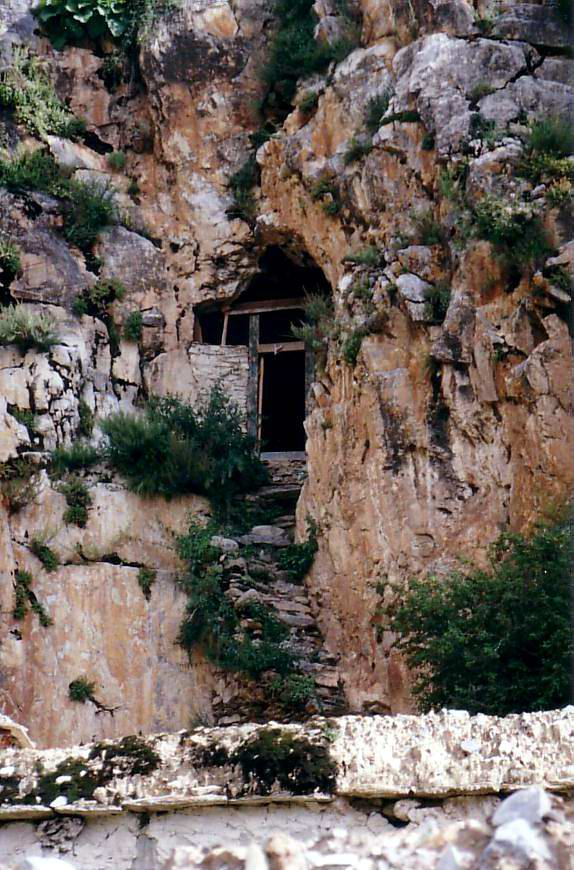
Entrance to Dawa Puk, Guru Rinpoche's cave

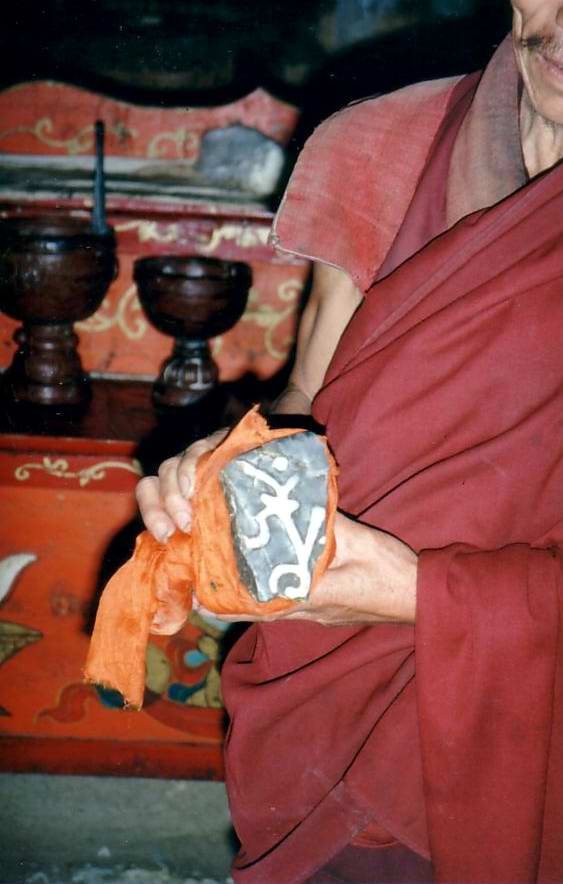
Self-originated sacred symbol

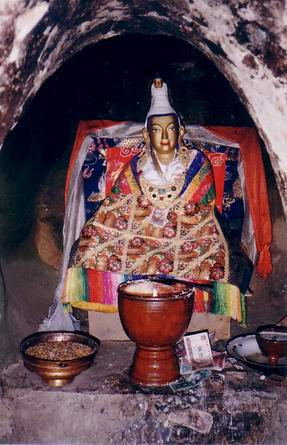
A statue of Emperor Songtsen Gampo in his meditation cave at Yerpa

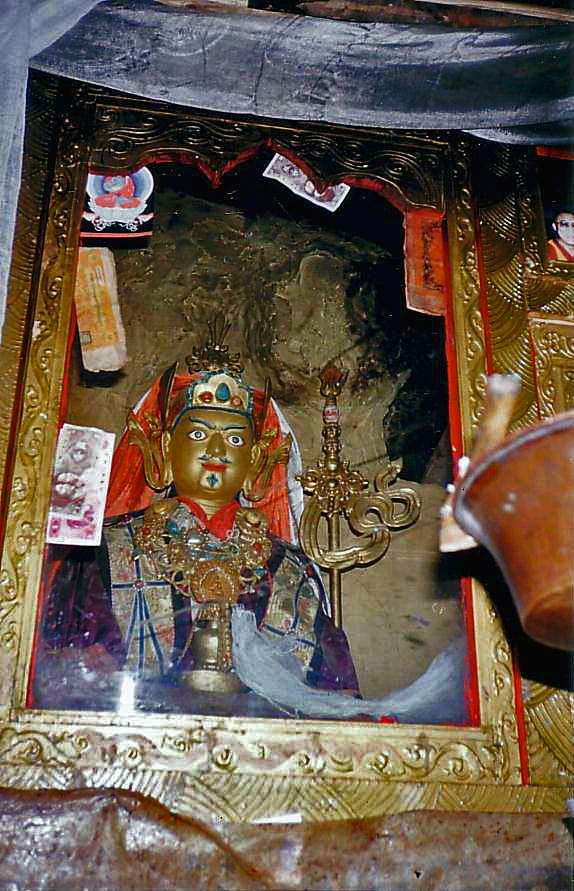
Statue of Guru Rinpoche in his meditation cave at Yerpa

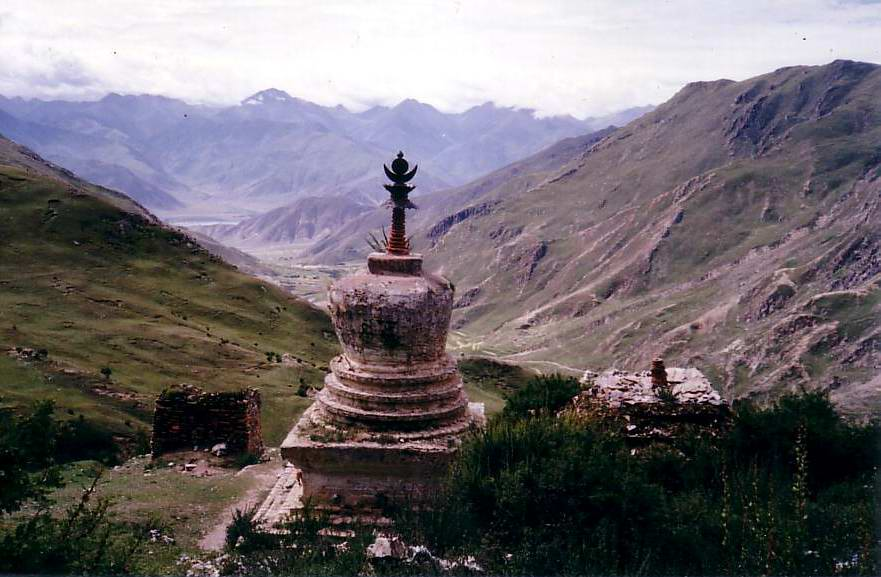
Yerpa Valley below a chorten

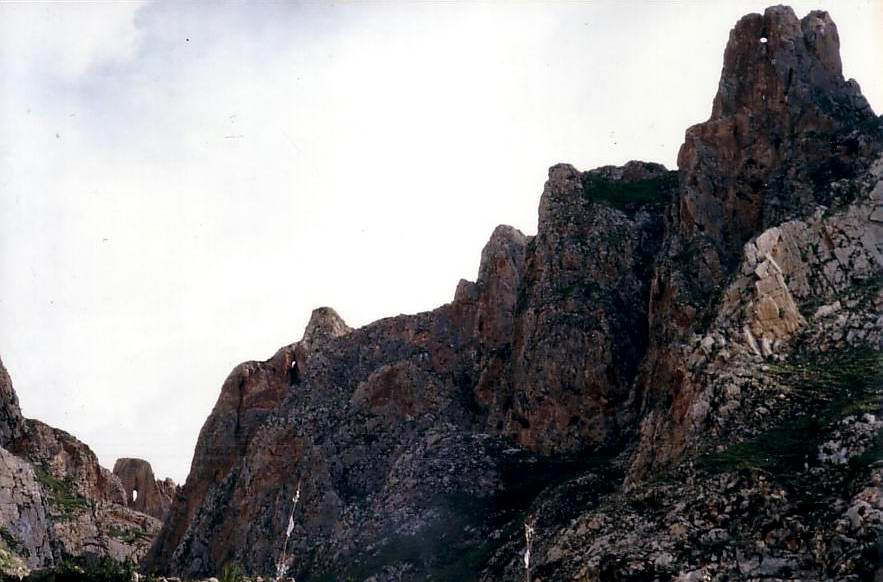
Gesar's arrow holes. (Click to view the holes in the mountains).

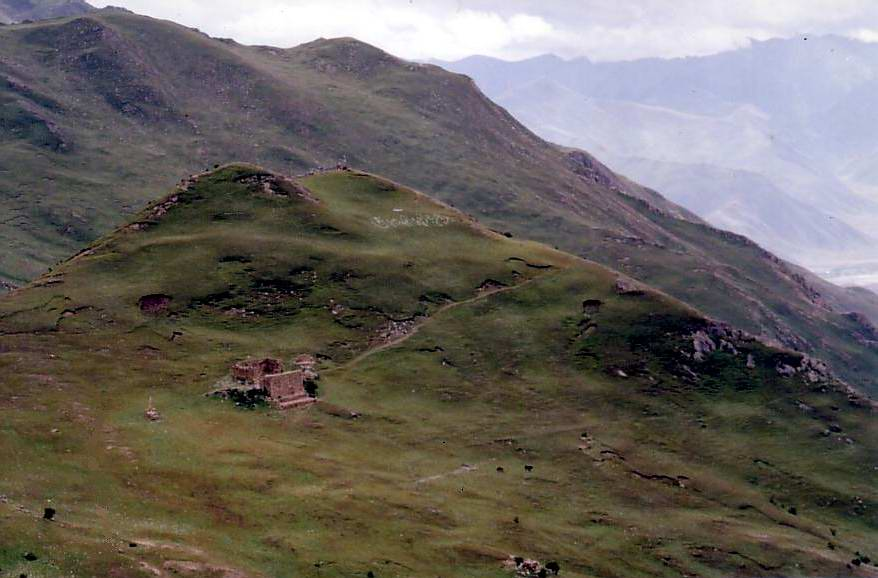
Sky burial site, Yerpa.

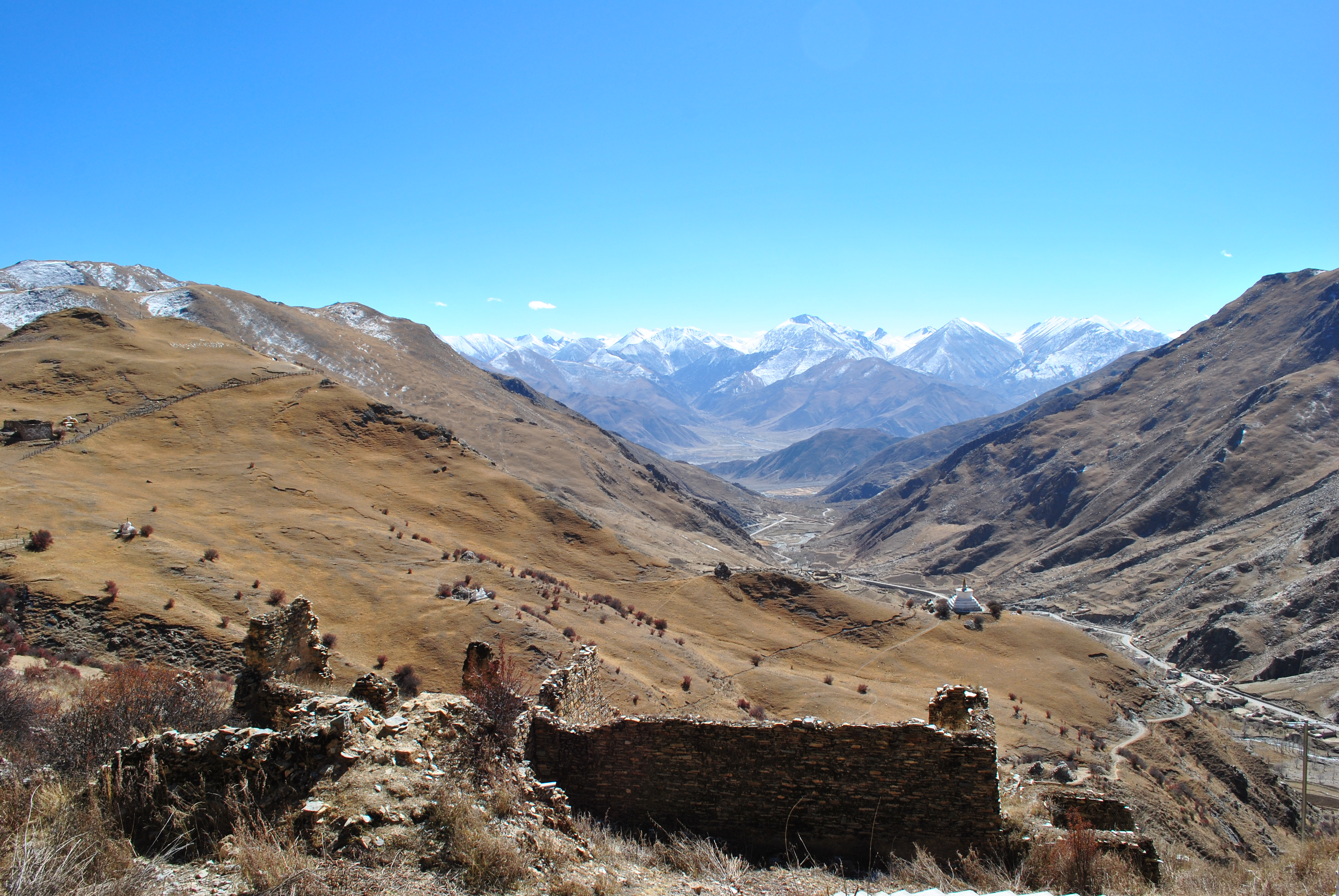
Drak Yerpa valley from the destroyed Monastery

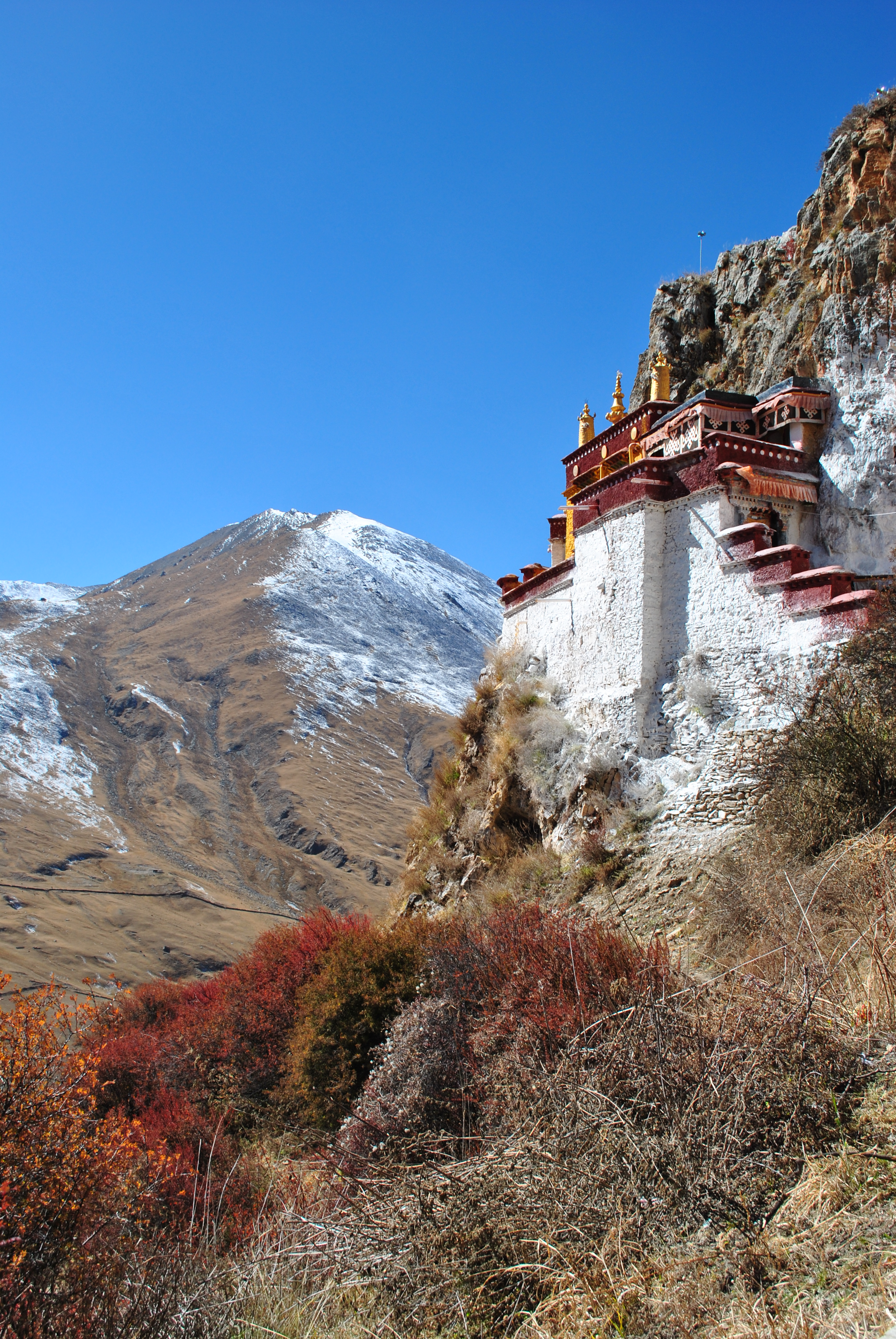
Drak Yerpa

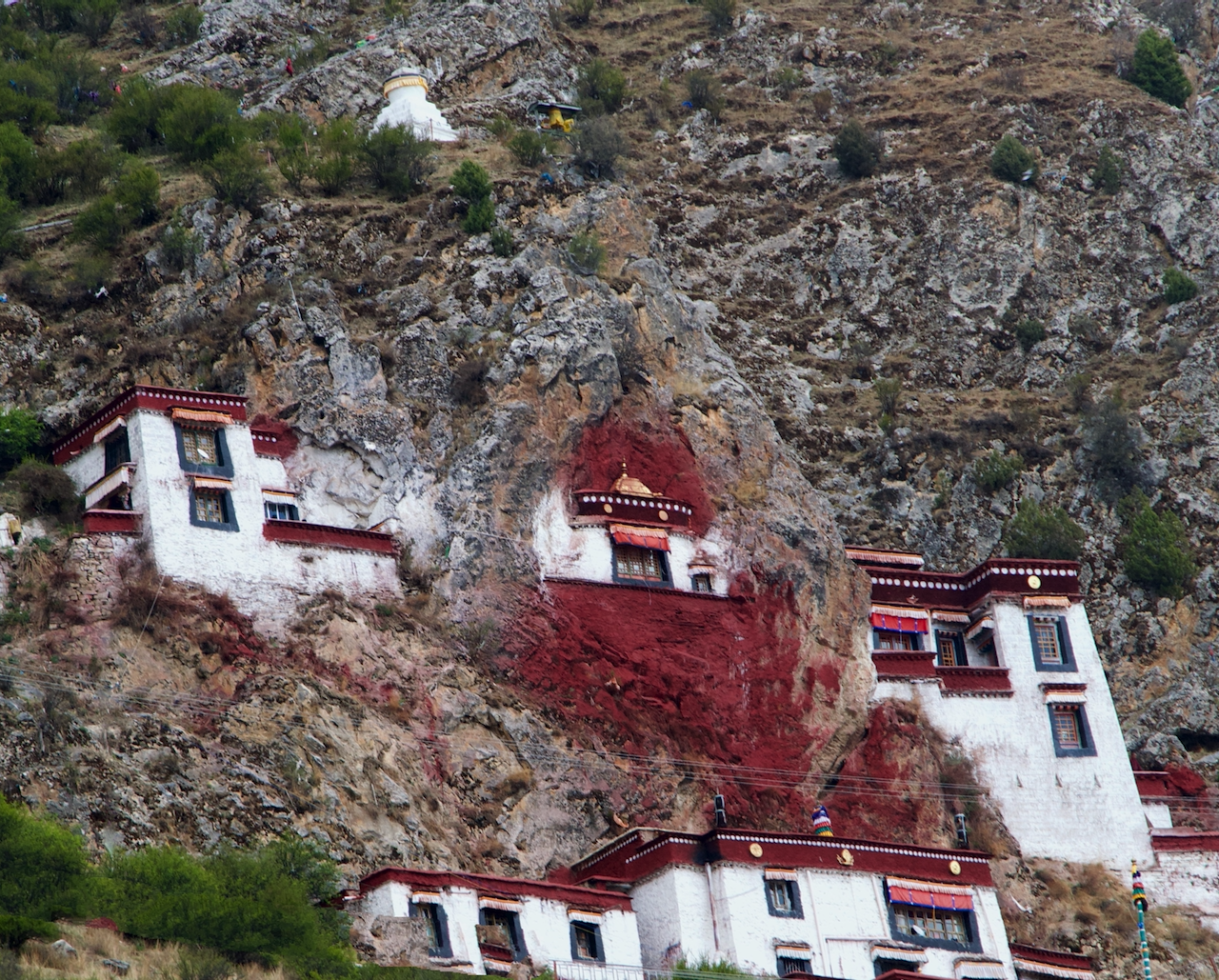
Drak Yerpa, 2015
