= Thothori Nyantsen =

28th King of Tibet

Thothori Nyantsen or Lha Thothori Nyantsan (Tibetan: ལྷ་ཐོ་ཐོ་རི་གཉན་བཙན་, Wylie: lha tho tho ri gnyan btsan), was the 28th King of Tibet and among the members of the Yarlung dynasty's 42 kings who ruled Tibet from 127 BCE to 842 AD. According to legend, he received Tibet's first Buddhist texts from the sky and guarded them, his epithet "Lha" was his honorary title which means "divine, pertaining to the gods of the sky". Modern scholars believe that he indeed was a historical person and king.

Since he is also mentioned in a Chinese source, they date his rule to the 5th century, because the 33rd king Songtsen Gampo died in 683; other calculations putting his birth at 173 or 254 are nowadays rejected. He did not rule over the entire Tibetan Plateau since the future Tibetan Empire had not yet been established.

Mahayana Buddhist scriptures, among them the Kāraṇḍavyūhasūtra first arrived in Tibet in his time. Verbal history states this happened as the volumes and treasures fell from the sky onto the roof of the royal Yumbulagang Palace. Another account states there was the arrival of a Buddhist missionary who brought the gifts for the king.

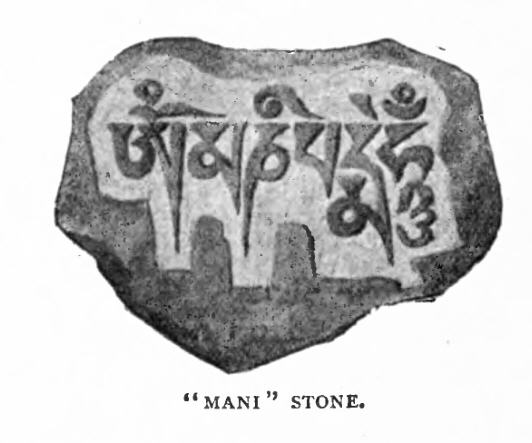
Mani stone
