= Yarlung dynasty =

Historical dynasty in Tibet

The Yarlung dynasty (Tibetan: བོད་ཀྱི་གདོད་མའི་མངའ་མཛད།) was a Tibetan dynasty that existed from 127 BCE to 842 CE according to traditional Tibetan historiography. It produced 42 rulers and gave rise to the Tibetan Empire from 614 CE to 848 CE, under the 33rd monarch Songtsen Gampo and lasting through to the 40th monarch Ralpachen. Ralpachen was murdered in 838 by his brother, the future 41st monarch Langdarma, who in turn ruled for only one year (841–842) until his own murder. The dissolution of the empire occurred by 848.

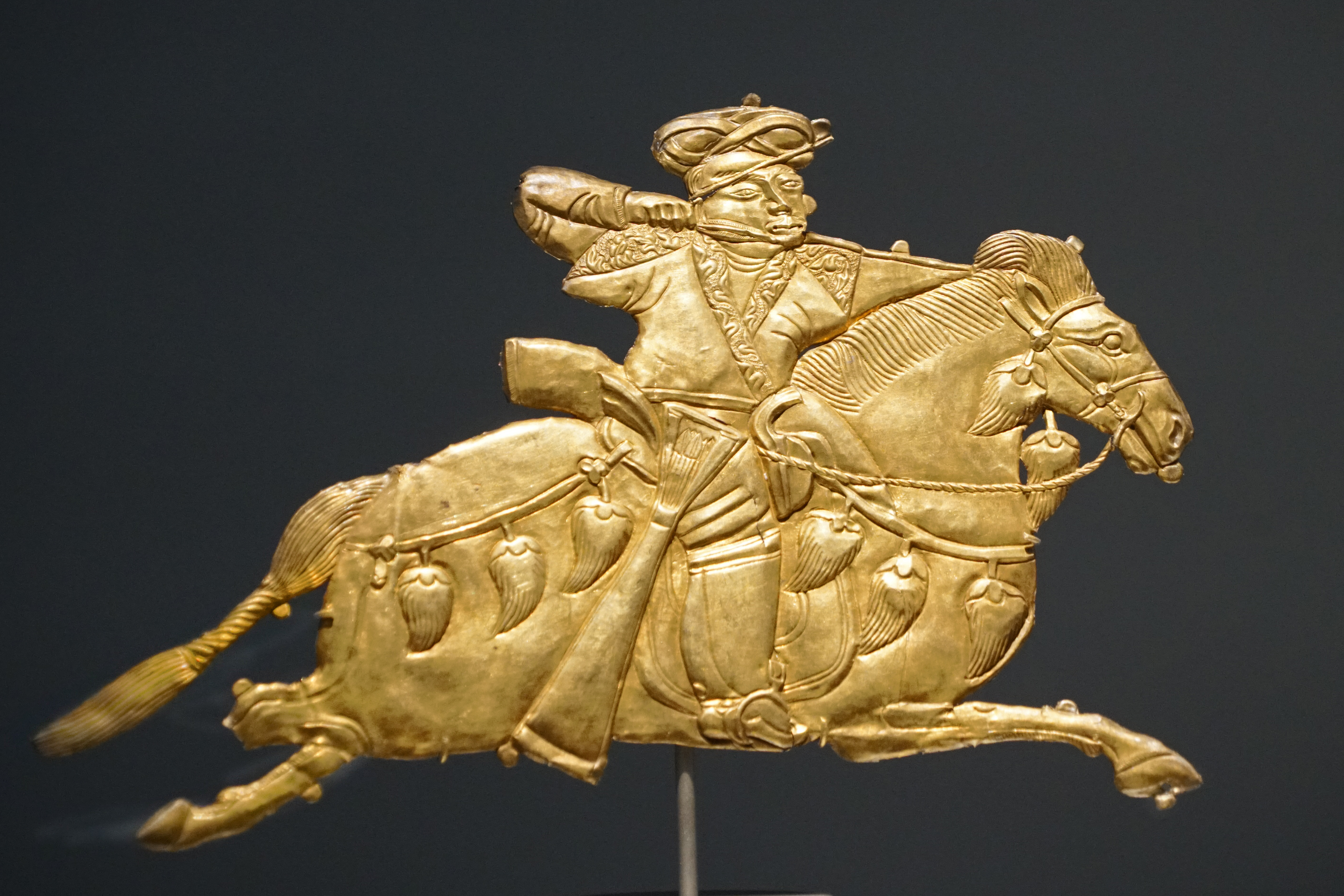
Tibetan plaque, Yarlung dynasty, 600–800 (Collection Al Thani, Paris).

The early Yarlung dynasty rulers lived before the Tibetan script was created, and their reigns and lives were documented through the verbal history until c. 650 when in the reign of the 33rd king of the Yarlung dynasty, Songtsen Gampo, the Tibetan alphabet and grammar were created and the royal record keeping of people and events called the Chronicle of Ba began. Some scholars have questioned the definitive existence of early dynasty due to the lack of written records before 650.

== History ==
=== Pre-empire ===
The Yarlung dynasty started in 127 BCE with Nyatri Tsenpo. He built the first building in Tibet, the Yumbulagang Palace, on a hill overlooking the banks of the Yarlung Tsangpo River. It is situated on the south-east Tibetan Plateau which included the areas of Yarlung, Kongpo, due south of the future capital at Lhasa. The early history of the dynasty comes largely from a verbal history lineage.

According to verbal history, King Nyatri Tsenpo and his six immediate successors ascended upwards by a "sky rope", so the location of their tombs are not to be found. The tombs of the later kings, from the eighth king Drigum Tsenpo, and onward are located in the Yarlung Valley at Chongye, in U-Tsang.

The first mention of the dynasty outside Asia was in "Geography" by Claudius Ptolemy (87–165 CE). The country was named "Batai", as derived from the Tibetan endonym Bod-yul (Tibetan: བོད་ཡུལ་).

Tibet traditionally consisted of multiple polities until the kings Tagri Nyensig and Namri Songtsen (570–620 CE) unified the plateau after a series of wars and revolts. Namri Songtsen would later establish a capital in the Lhasa River which would form into the Rasa settlement. Successive rulers would continue to expand the settlement and build on mountain Marpori overlooking what would later be named the city of Lhasa, Tibet's traditional capital.

=== Tibetan Empire ===
During the life of the 33rd king Songtsen Gampo (601–683 CE), Tibet became the most powerful empire in Central Asia. His reign saw multiple developments in Tibetan society such as the establishment of a structured system of land use, the formal creation of state funds, the division of the emergent empire into six provinces, and the re-organization of the military.

He is also the patron of Tibet's writing system, giving Thonmi Sambhota the task of inventing and developing what would become the Tibetan script that he created after closely studying various Indian scripts. The script is believed to be based on both the Brahmi and the Gupta script. But Songtsen Gampo is best remembered because of his introduction of Mahayana Buddhism to Tibet, for which he became the first Dharma King (Chogyal Gyalpo).

Songtsen Gampo retired to study the Tibetan script and grammar and passed the crown to his son Gungsong Gungtsen, but at the age of eighteen he would die, forcing Songtsen Gampo to once again take the throne. It is believed that an internal power struggle occurred at this time.

The northern territories of Burma (modern-day Myanmar) are believed to have been annexed by the Tibetan empire at this time as well as a Licchavi kingdom in Nepal, by 640.

The Empire of Tibet continued expanding. After Songtsen Gampo came two more powerful kings that continued to expand the empire of Tibet. The second great king was Trisong Detsen who invited Guru Padmasambhava to Tibet and founded Tibetan Buddhism of the Vajrayana. He commissioned the Samye Monastery, that was completed in 780 CE (Schaik 2013:36).

The 40th king Ralpachen grew the empire to its furthest extents, north into Turkestan, east into China, south into India, and west into Afghanistan and beyond. He was the third great "Dharma King" (Chogyal Gyalpo) who embraced and furthered Tibetan Buddhism and was therefore honored with the spiritual title of Dharma King as were Songsten Gampo and Trison Deutsen. Ralpachen was killed by his brother Ü Dum Tsen (Langdarma) in 838 CE, after which the Tibetan empire dissolved by 848.

== See also ==
- List of emperors of Tibet
