= Drigum Tsenpo =

8th King of Tibet

Drigum Tsenpo was the 8th king of Tibet. According to Tibetan mythology, he was the first king of Tibet to lose his immortality when he angered his stable master, Lo-Ngam. Legend states that rulers of Tibet descended from heaven to earth on a cord, and that they were pulled back up when their time came. Lo-Ngam cut the cord, leading to Drigum Tsenpo's death; he thus became the first Tibetan ruler to be buried on earth.

There is a detailed, if rather fabulous, account of his life in the Old Tibetan Chronicle.
