= Namri Songtsen =

32nd King of Tibet (?-618)

Namri Songtsen གནམ་རི་སྲོང་བཙན
- Tsenpo

King of Tibet
- Reign: c. 570 – 618
- Predecessor: Tagbu Nyasig
- Successor: Songtsen Gampo
- Born: Unknown; Tibet
- Died: 618; Tibet
- Burial: Gungri Sokka Mausoleum, Valley of the Kings
- Spouse: Driza Tönkar
- Issue: Songtsen Gampo
Regnal name
- Namri Songtsen (གནམ་རི་སྲོང་བཙན)
- Dynasty: Yarlung
- Father: Tagbu Nyasig
- Mother: Tongtsün Drokar
- Religion: Bon

Namri Songtsen (Tibetan: གནམ་རི་སྲོང་བཙན, Wylie: gnam ri srong btsan, ZWPY: Namri Songzän), also known as Namri Löntsen (Wylie: gnam ri slon mtshan) was according to tradition, the 32nd King of Tibet of the Yarlung dynasty from 570 until his death in 618. During his 48 years of reign, he expanded his kingdom to rule the central part of the Tibetan Plateau. He also had a good diplomatic partnership with other tribes and kingdoms. His actions were decisive in the setting up of the Tibetan Empire, to which he can be named co-founder with his son, Songtsen Gampo. He had reportedly conquered the Kingdom of Sumpa in the early 7th century.

== Diplomatic relations ==
The Kingdom of southern Tibet, was said to have once donated 20,000 households to Namri Songtsen, to maintain its sovereignty.

== Context ==
Namri Songtsen was a member of the Yarlung tribe, located to the southeast of Lhasa, in the fertile Yarlung Valley where the Tsangpo (known in India as the Brahmaputra) supported both agriculture and human life. The Tibetan Plateau was, at this time, a mosaic of clans of mountain shepherds with simple nomadic organizations where intertribal fighting and razzia sorties were part of the local economy. Each clan had several chiefs. These clans had few materials and cultural exchanges due to topography, climate, and distance, so each clan, located in a specified network of valleys, had its own culture with little in common with other clans. These "proto-Tibetans" were isolated from relations with the outside world, though some mountain groups to the east in Sichuan, Qinghai and the 'Azha kingdom dwelt in border areas contiguous with, or within, the Chinese empire. Early Chinese sources appear to mention proto-Tibetan peoples in a few rare cases, if the Qiang and Rong do indeed refer to them. This changed dramatically by the beginning of the Tang dynasty, when the Tibetan kingdom becoming a powerful player in the military history of Eastern and Central Asia.

Several Tibetan historical accounts say that it was in Namri Songtsen's time that Tibetans obtained their first knowledge of astrology and medicine from China. Others associate the introduction of these sciences with his son. In the period, knowledge of these and other sciences came from a variety of countries, not only from China, but also from Buddhist India, Byzantium, and Central Asia.

== Upbringing and life ==
Around 600 CE, Namri Songtsen, one of the Yarlung tribal chieftains, became the uncontested leader of the several Yarlung clans. Using shepherd-warriors he subdued the neighbouring tribes one after another. Expanding his rule to all of modern Central Tibet, including the Lhasa region allowed him to rule over many groups, and to begin the establishment of a centralized and strong state, with skilled troops who gained experience in their many battles in the early 7th century. This formed an important base for the later conquests by his son, which unified the whole of the Tibetan Plateau. Furthermore, Namri Songtsen relocated the capital of his kingdom to the Gyama Valley, where he built the Gyama Palace. According to Beckwith, Namri Songtsen sent the first diplomatic missions to open relations with China, in 608 and 609.

== Military campaigns ==
Namri Songtsen was once said to have led 10,000 soldiers to Sumpa to conquer it. After achieving this remarkable feat, Namri Songtsen granted the influential nobles of sumpa; various territories and slaves to gain their immediate loyalty. Subsequently the Yarlung Dynasty became the largest power in the Tibetan Plateau, and by integrating central and southern Tibet into one, it achieved the effects of population increase, economic development, and military strength, and finally transformed from a tribal state into an imperial one.

== Assassination and succession ==
Namri Songtsen was assassinated by poisoning in 618 or 629/630, by a coup d'état which eventually failed, being crushed by Namri Songtsen's son, who developed his heritage, completing the submission of the Tibetan Plateau, and, according to later histories, introduced a unified legal code, a Tibetan writing system, an archive for official records, an army, and relations with the outside world.

== See also ==
- Pre-Imperial Tibet
- History of Tibet
- List of emperors of Tibet

== Notes ==
=== Sources ===
- Josef Kolmaš, Tibet and Imperial China, A Survey of Sino-Tibetan Relations up to the End of the Madchu Dynasty in 1912. Occasional paper No. 7, The Australian National University, Centre of Oriental Studies, Canberra, 1967. Page 7-11/67. (lire en ligne, appuyer sur F11 pour l'affichage plein écran)
- Stein, R. A. (1972). Tibetan Civilization. Faber and Faber, London; Stanford University Press, Stanford, California. ISBN 0-8047-0806-1 (cloth); ISBN 0-8047-0901-7.

Regnal titles
Preceded by Tagbu Nyasig	King of Tibet ?–629	Succeeded by Songtsän Gampo
