= Tibetan Annals =

Two Old Tibetan manuscripts

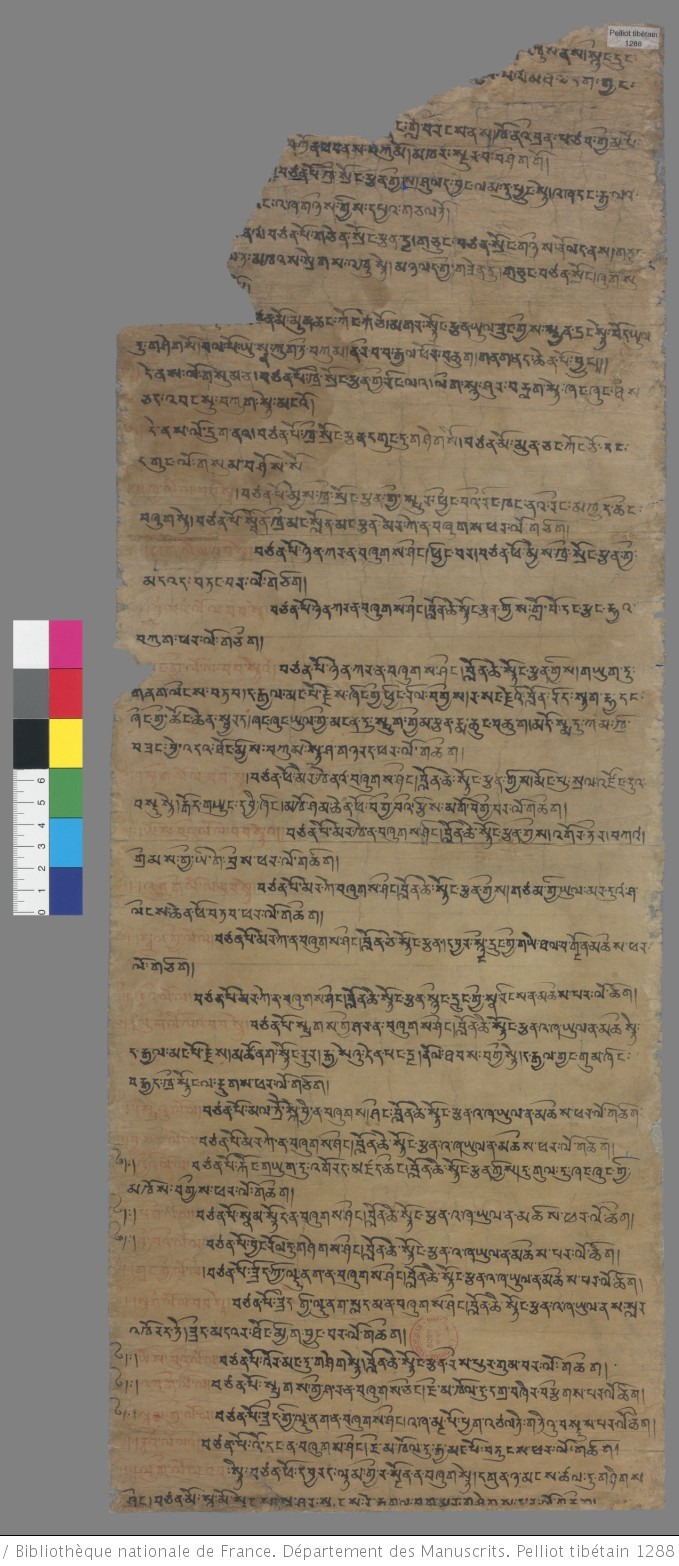
First page of Pelliot Tibétain 1288

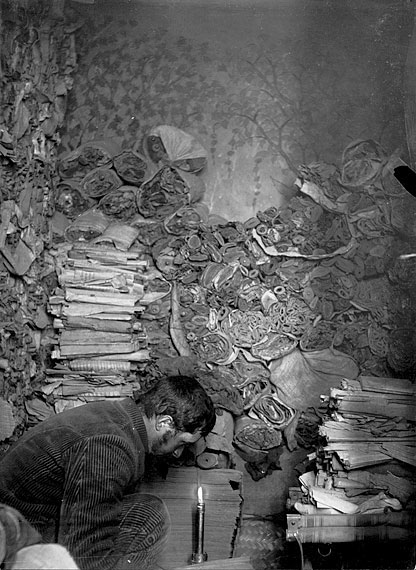
Paul Pelliot examines manuscripts in cave 17

The Tibetan Annals or Old Tibetan Annals (OTA) are composed of two manuscripts written in Old Tibetan language found in the early 20th century in the "hidden library" in the Mogao Grottoes near Dunhuang in northwestern Gansu province, Western China, which is believed to have been sealed in the 11th century CE. They form Tibet's earliest extant history.

The two manuscripts are known as the "civil" and "military" versions of the Annals. The "civil" version is designated IOL Tib J 750 in the British Library in London and Pelliot tibétain 1288 in the Bibliothèque Nationale in Paris; both are originally from the same original roll, 4.34 metres long and 0.258 metres wide. The "civil" version covers the years 650–748 with some gaps. The "military" version is designated Or.8212/187 and is also held at the British Library. This version is much shorter and covers the years 743–765 with some gaps.

== Discovery ==
An enormous number of early manuscripts in a variety of languages were collected by A. Stein and P. Pelliot at the famous sealed-up Library Cave (no. 17) of the Mogao Grottoes and sent back to London and Paris respectively. Among these Dunhuang manuscripts, The Tibetan Annals (or "Tibet’s First History") were found along with the "Old Tibetan Chronicle", which was probably compiled between 800 and 840 CE.

== Contents ==
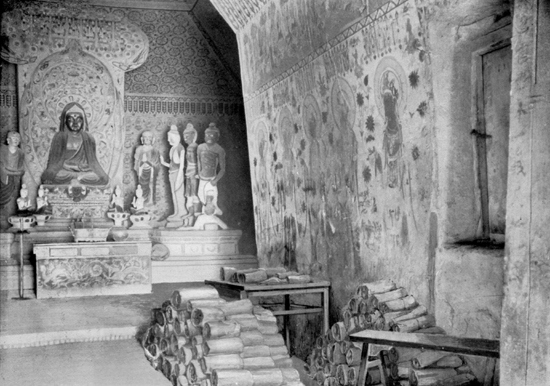
Cave 16 and the manuscripts piled up for Aurel Stein near the entrance to Cave 17, the “library cave”

The Annals begin with a very brief account of the early events of the reign of Songtsen Gampo, the first Tibetan Emperor. From the time the Chinese Princess Wencheng arrived in 643 CE until Songtsen Gampo's death in 650 it is possible to accurately date the entries. It then gives a dated, year-by-year précis of important events from 650 to 764 CE. For example, in 763 CE, Tibetan soldiers captured the Chinese capital of Chang'an for fifteen days when the ruling Tang dynasty was recovering from the An Lushan Rebellion. Of course, annals continued to be recorded after this date, but only one or two other minor fragments have survived. The Tibetan cyclic system dates are in much-faded red ink.

These accounts, generally accepted as sober court records, provide a priceless view of Tibet in its early phase of expansion and establishment as a powerful empire. They also provide a valuable way of checking and dating events mentioned in later Tibetan and Chinese historical records.

Neither the Annals nor the Chronicle make any mention of Buddhism in the reign of Songtsen Gampo.
