= List of emperors of Tibet =

Yarlung dynasty's kings of Tibet

The traditional list of the ancient Yarlung dynasty's Tibetan kings consists of 42 names. The early kings ruled before the Tibetan script was developed; the history of Tibet was thus transmitted verbally and only written after the formation of Tibetan Empire. While there is a lack of contemporary biographical manuscripts detailing the lives of the first 26 kings, the lives of the later ones were better documented.

All of the kings are known as representatives of the Yarlung dynasty, named after the Yarlung Tsangpo and its Yarlung Valley. Their titles are more correctly translated as "chief", not "emperor". The unified Tibetan state is documented beginning with the 31st, the 32nd, and the 33rd kings.

Traditional Tibetan titles for the king include tsenpo ("Chief") and lhase ("Divine Son").

== List ==
In the list the common transliteration is given first, the academic one in brackets.

#	Name	Reign	Religion
1	Nyatri Tsenpo	127 BCE – ???	Bon
2	Mutri Tsenpo		Bon
3	Dingtri Tsenpo		Bon
4	Sotri Tsenpo		Bon
5	Mertri Tsenpo		Bon
6	Dakrri Tsenpo		Bon
7	Siptri Tsenpo		Bon
8	Drigum Tsenpo		Bon
9	Chatri Tsenpo		Bon
10	Esho Lek		Bon
11	Desho Lek		Bon
12	Tisho Lek		Bon
13	Guru Lek		Bon
14	Trongzhi Lek		Bon
15	Isho Lek		Bon
16	Zanam Zindé		Bon
17	Detrul Namshungtsen		Bon
18	Senöl Namdé		Bon
19	Senöl Podé		Bon
20	Senöl Nam		Bon
21	Senöl Po		Bon
22	Degyel Po		Bon
23	Detrin Tsen		Bon
24	Tori Longtsen		Bon
25	Tritsen Nam		Bon
26	Tridra Pungtsen		Bon
27	Tritog Jetsen		Bon
28	Lha Thothori Nyantsen		Bon
29	Trinyen Zungtsen		Bon
30	Drongnyen Deu		Bon
31	Tagbu Nyasig		Bon
32	Namri Songtsen	570–618	Bon
33	Songtsen Gampo	614–648, 655–660	Tibetan Buddhism
34	Gungsong Gungtsen	649–655	Tibetan Buddhism
35	Mangsong Mangtsen	660–676	Tibetan Buddhism
36	Tridu Songtsen	676–704	Tibetan Buddhism
37	Tride Tsuktsen Mé Aktsom	705–755	Tibetan Buddhism
38	Trisong Detsen	755–797	Tibetan Buddhism
39	Murub or Muné Tsenpo	797–799	Tibetan Buddhism
40	Mutik Tsenpo (Sadnalegs)	800–815	Tibetan Buddhism
41	Ralpachen	815–838	Tibetan Buddhism
42	Langdarma	841–842	Bon

== See also ==
- Pre-Imperial Tibet
- List of rulers of Tibet
- List of Lönchen of the Tibetan Empire
