= Foreign relations of Tibet =

Tibetan foreign relations from the 7th century CE to 20th century CE

The foreign relations of Tibet are documented from the 7th century onward, when Buddhism was introduced by missionaries from India and Nepal. As part of its expansion, the Tibetan Empire fought against its neighbors such as Zhangzhung, Tuyuhun, and the Tang dynasty, although it cemented two peace marriages with the latter as well. Centuries after the empire's dissolution, its territories were conquered by the Mongols which ruled it under the Yuan dynasty. During the Ming dynasty, Tibet was at least a tributary state. The system of Dalai Lamas was created during that time by a Mongol prince loyal to the Ming. Tibet was later invaded by remnant Mongol forces, but they were defeated by the Qing dynasty, which gradually turned Tibet into its subject during the 18th and 19th centuries. Following a successful invasion in 1904, the British Empire established trade relations with Lhasa, accepting Chinese suzerainty over Ü-Tsang and western Kham, as well as Chinese sovereignty over Amdo and eastern Kham where the populations are more mixed. (Note: The Simla Convention used the terms "Outer Tibet" and "Inner Tibet".) Although never diplomatically recognized by them, the Tibetan government was courted by Nazi Germany, Imperial Japan, and the United States before and during World War II. Chinese control was re-established after its annexation of central Tibet in 1951, and the 14th Dalai Lama eventually fled to India in 1959. Countries today recognize Tibet as a part of China.

== Early history ==
Little is known about Tibet before the 7th century when Buddhism was introduced by missionaries from India. Since the 7th century, the Tibetan Empire emerged as a strong regional power and lasted until the 9th century.

=== Conquest of Zhangzhun ===
Zhangzhung or Shangshung was an ancient kingdom existing from about 500 BC to 625 AD when it was conquered by the Tibetan Empire to its east. Zhangzhung people were mentioned frequently in ancient Tibetan texts as the original rulers of the area around Mount Kailash. Zhangzhung culture is associated with the Bon religion, which influenced the philosophies and practices of Tibetan Buddhism.

=== War against the Tuyuhun ===
In the 660s, the Tibetan Empire invaded and destroyed the Tuyuhun kingdom in the Lake Kokonor region (approximately Amdo in Tibetan and Qinghai in modern China). The war removed a vital buffer state between Tibet and the Tang Dynasty, leading to direct conflict between the two.

== Relations with the Tang dynasty ==
The Tang dynasty (618–907) and the Tibetan Empire (618–842) were both powerful empires. Sino-Tibetan relations during the period between 618 and 842 were characterized by almost constant conflict and periodic attempts at peace-making.

It is recorded in Tibetan tradition that after Songtsen Gampo died in 650, the Chinese Tang dynasty attacked and captured Lhasa, however there is no record of it from Chinese sources.

There was a stone pillar, the Lhasa Zhol rdo-rings, in the ancient village of Zhol in front of the Potala in Lhasa, dating to c. 764 CE during the reign of Trisong Detsen. The inscription contains an account of the brief capture of Chang'an, the Chinese capital, in 763 CE during the reign of Emperor Daizong of Tang. As of 1993 the pillar was surrounded by buildings and wire so it could not be approached closely.

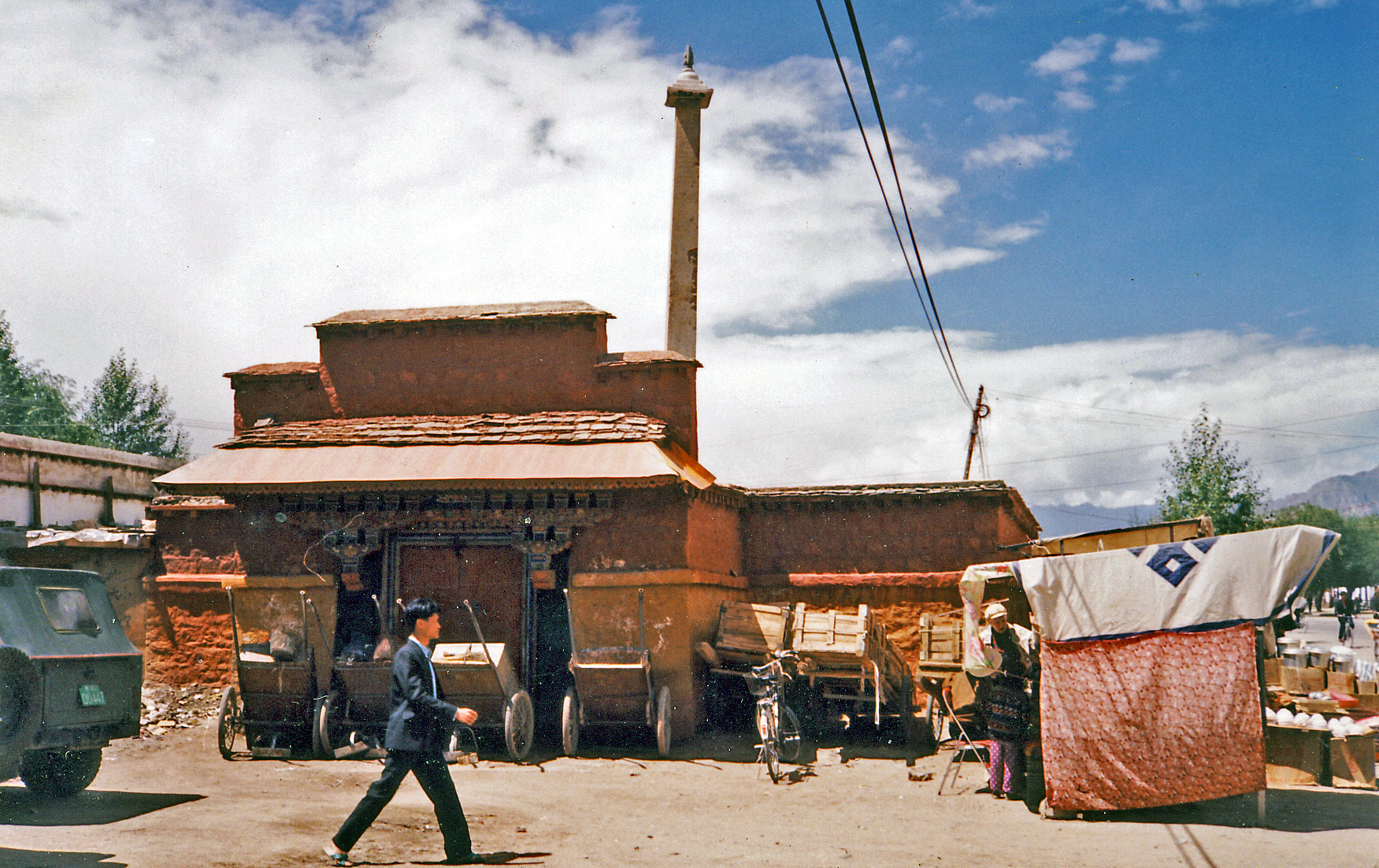
Lhasa Zhol Rdo-rings pillar 1993

In 785, Wei Kao, a Chinese serving as an official in Shuh repulsed Tibetan invasions of the area.

A stone monument dating to 823 and setting out the terms of peace and borders between Tibet and China arrived at in 821 can still be seen in front of the Jokhang temple in Barkhor Square in Lhasa. The monument, a treaty of friendship, is written in both Tibetan and Chinese. The inscribed pillar was erected by the Chinese in 1793 during a smallpox epidemic. It records the Sino-Tibetan treaty of 822 concluded by King Ralpacan and includes the following inscription: "Tibet and China shall abide by the frontiers of which they are now in occupation. All to the east is the country of Great China; and all to the west is, without question, the country of Great Tibet. Henceforth on neither side shall there be waging of war nor seizing of territory. If any person incurs suspicion he shall be arrested; his business shall be inquired into and he shall be escorted back." The inscription also carried advice on hygiene measures to prevent smallpox.

The relations between the two countries appears to have been complex. On the one hand, the monument describes connections between China and Tibet as similar to those between uncle and nephew. The Tang dynasty of China and the Yarlung dynasty of Tibet were indeed related by marriage, yet the terms uncle and nephew are not used in relation to other groups with whom the Chinese had connections by marriage. On the other hand, the monument seems to describe the two countries as equals. The text has been published several times.

== Relations with the Song dynasty ==
The Tibetan Empire and the Tang dynasty, both of which were military powers, fell in 842 and 907 respectively. After that, Tibet entered an era of disunity known as the Era of Fragmentation. The Sino-Tibetan relations during the Song dynasty (960–1279) were ones of relative peace and cultural creativity.

== Mongol conquest and Tibet under the Yuan dynasty ==
After the Mongol Prince Köden took control of the Kokonor region in 1239, in order to investigate the possibility of attacking Song China from the West, he sent his general Doorda Darqan on a reconnaissance mission into Tibet in 1240. During this expedition the Kadampa (Bka'-gdams) monasteries of Rwa-sgreng and Rgyal-lha-khang were burned, and 500 people killed. The death of Ögödei the Mongol Khan in 1241 brought Mongol military activity around the world ground, temporarily, to a halt. Mongol interests in Tibet resumed in 1244 when Prince Köden sent an invitation to Sakya Pandita (1182–1251) to come to his capital and formally surrender Tibet to the Mongols. Sakya Pandita arrived in Kokonor with his two nephews 'Phags-pa (1235–80) and Phyag-na Rdo-rje (1239–67) in 1246.

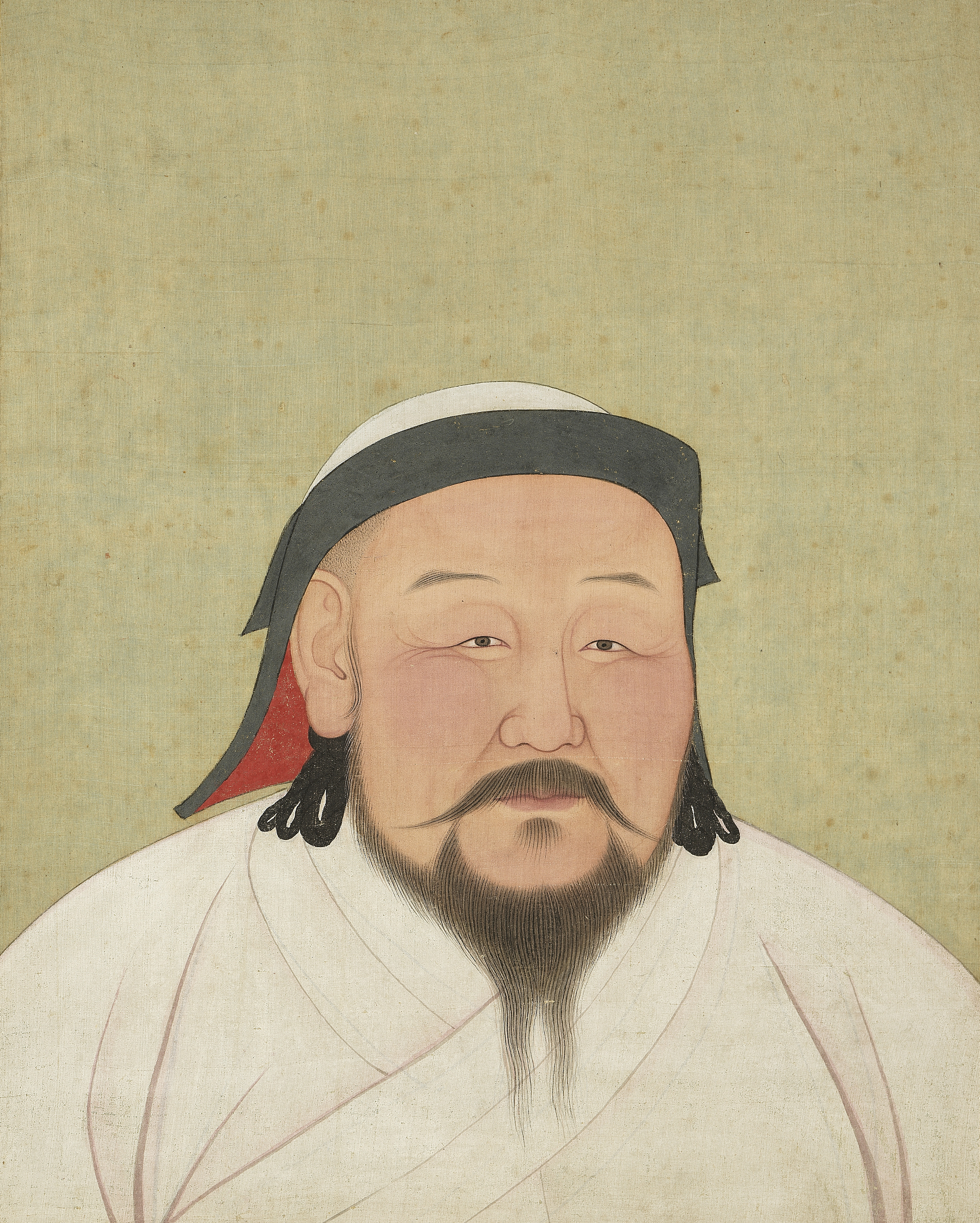
Kublai Khan

After an internecine feud among the Mongol princes Kublai was appointed by Möngke Khan to take charge over the Chinese campaigns in 1253. Since Sakya Pandita had already died Kublai took 'Phags-pa into his camp as a symbol of Tibet's surrender. Kublai was elected Khagan in 1260 following the death of his brother Möngke, although his ascendance was not uncontested. At that point he named 'Phags-pa as "State Preceptor" (Guoshi). In 1265 'Phags-pa returned to Tibet and for the first time made an attempt to impose Sakya hegemony with the appointment of Sakya Bzang-po (a long time servant and ally of the Sakyas) as the dpon-chen ('great administrator') over Tibet in 1267. A census was conducted in 1268 and Tibet was divided into 13 myriarchies.

In 1269 'Phags-pa returned to Kublai's side at his new capital Khanbaliq (modern day Beijing). He presented Kublai Khan with a new script (the 'Phags-pa script) designed to represent all of the languages of the empire. The next year he was named Imperial Preceptor (Dishi) of the Yuan dynasty, and his position as titular ruler of Tibet (now in the form of its 13 myriarchies) was reconfirmed, while the Mongols managed a structural and administrative rule over the region. The Yuan-Sakya hegemony over Tibet continued into the middle of the 14th century, although it was challenged by a revolt of the 'Bri-khung sect with the assistance of Hülegü of the Ilkhanate in 1285. The revolt was suppressed in 1290 when the Sakyas and eastern Mongols burned 'Bri-khung and killed 10,000 people (cf. Wylie 1977).

== Relations with the Ming dynasty ==
The Ming dynasty considered Tibet to be part of the Western Regions. While the Ming dynasty at its height had some degree of influence in Tibet, the exact nature of their relations is under dispute by modern scholars. Analysis of the relationship is further complicated by modern political conflicts and the application of Westphalian sovereignty to a time when the concept did not exist. The Historical Status of China's Tibet, a book published by the People's Republic of China, asserts that the Ming dynasty had unquestioned sovereignty over Tibet by pointing to the Ming court's issuing of various titles to Tibetan leaders, Tibetans' full acceptance of the titles, and a renewal process for successors of these titles that involved traveling to the Ming capital. Scholars in China also argue that Tibet has been an integral part of China since the 13th century and so it was a part of the Ming Empire. However, most scholars outside China, such as Turrell V. Wylie, Melvyn C. Goldstein, and Helmut Hoffman, say that the relationship was one of suzerainty, Ming titles were only nominal, Tibet remained an independent region outside Ming control, and it simply paid tribute until the Jiajing Emperor, who ceased relations with Tibet.

Some scholars note that Tibetan leaders during the Ming frequently engaged in civil war and conducted their own foreign diplomacy with neighboring states such as Nepal. Some scholars underscore the commercial aspect of the Ming–Tibetan relationship, noting the Ming dynasty's shortage of horses for warfare and thus the importance of the horse trade with Tibet. Others argue that the significant religious nature of the relationship of the Ming court with Tibetan lamas is underrepresented in modern scholarship.

In the hope of reviving the unique relationship during the Yuan dynasty, and his spiritual superior Drogön Chögyal Phagpa of the Sakya school of Tibetan Buddhism, the Yongle Emperor made a concerted effort to build a secular and religious alliance with Deshin Shekpa, the Karmapa of the Karma Kagyu school. However, the Yongle Emperor's attempts were unsuccessful.

The Ming initiated sporadic armed intervention in Tibet during the 14th century but did not garrison permanent troops there. The Tibetans also sometimes used armed resistance against Ming forays. The Wanli Emperor made attempts to re-establish Ming–Tibetan relations after the Mongol–Tibetan alliance initiated in 1578, which affected the foreign policy of the subsequent Qing dynasty in its support for the Dalai Lama of the Gelug school. By the late 16th century, the Mongols were successful armed protectors of the Gelug Dalai Lama after they increased their presence in the Amdo region. That culminated in Güshi Khan's conquest of Tibet from 1637 to 1642 and the establishment of the Ganden Phodrang regime by the 5th Dalai Lama with his help.

== Tibet under the Qing dynasty ==
The armies of the Qing dynasty first entered Tibet in response to a request for help when Tibet was invaded by the Dzungar Mongols in 1717. After the defeat of a first expeditionary force in the Battle of the Salween River in 1718 the Chinese expedition in 1720 was successful in restoring the Dalai Lama to power in Lhasa. Troops were withdrawn in 1723 leaving a civilian Chinese adviser in Lhasa. When civil war broke out in 1728 there were appeals from both sides for help from China and an army was once again dispatched to Lhasa. It was decided to appoint two "ambans", civilian Chinese advisers to the Tibetan government, who would be guarded by a small military force. When there was unrest in 1750 an army was again dispatched and the ambans given more power. However, the ambans, isolated from imperial power centers, soon fell under the control of the local government. There was a long period of peace, and neglect by the Chinese of Tibetan affairs, but in 1792 an invasion by Gurkas of Nepal resulted in an appeal for aid and a successful Chinese response. In 1893 the Chinese imposed reforms in Tibet which resulted in closing of its borders to foreign travelers, but despite intentions to strengthen the role of the ambens, a long period of Chinese neglect followed which continued throughout the 19th century during which Tibet was "closed" but effectively on its own.

China did not make any attempt to impose direct rule on Tibet and the Tibetan government around the Dalai Lama or his regent continued to manage its day-to-day affairs, thus in their own view remaining independent. It was only after the invasion of imperial troops under the command of Zhao Erfeng in 1910 that an attempt at direct rule was made. The Tibetans were not cooperative and after the Republican Revolution of 1911 openly rebelled, surviving Chinese soldiers being evacuated through India. Declarations of independence made by the Dalai Lama were not recognized by Britain or China, but an effective military frontier was established which excluded troops and agents of the Chinese government until the invasion by the People's Liberation Army in 1950.

=== British mission to the Panchen Lama ===
After the Panchen Lama sent a letter to Warren Hastings first Governor-General of India with respect to a conflict of the British with Bhutan the British governor-general sent George Bogle in 1774 as emissary to the Panchen Lama. Traveling through Bhutan to the Panchen Lama's seat at Tashilhunpo in 1775 Bogle established friendly relations with the 3rd Panchen Lama, Lobsang Palden Yeshe, so friendly that he took a close relative of the Panchen Lama as his wife. On Bogle's death Captain Samuel Turner was appointed. However, following Hastings departure from India in 1785, there were no further direct relations with Tibet until late in the 19th century. Neither envoy was able to obtain permission to visit Lhasa or gain access to the Dalai Lama.

=== Russia and The Great Game ===
Between 1898 and 1901 Ngawang Dorjee traveled to St. Petersburg three times as an envoy of the Tibetan government. Gifts were exchanged and friendly relationships established, but no formal recognition resulted nor establishment of a Russian diplomatic presence in Lhasa. Ngawang Dorjee, the envoy, was one of the Buryats, a Lamaist people from the trans-Baikal region of Siberia, who had traveled to Tibet as a youth, studied at Drepung Monastery, been awarded the degree of Lharam Geshe, "Master of Metaphysics, and appointed one of the seven Lharam Geshe teachers of the young 13th Dalai Lama. In 1907, a treaty between Britain and Russia recognized Chinese suzerainty over Tibet and agreed not to negotiate with Tibet except through the intermediary of the Chinese government.Tibet Justice Center - Legal Materials on Tibet - Treaties and Conventions Relating to Tibet - Convention Between Great Britain and Russia (1907)[391]

=== The 1904 British expedition of Tibet ===
In 1904 A British diplomatic mission, accompanied by a large military escort, forced its way through to Lhasa.UK and China Relations The head of the diplomatic mission was Colonel Francis Younghusband. The principal motivation for the British mission was a fear, which proved to be unfounded, that Russia was extending its footprint into Tibet and possibly even giving military aid to the Tibetan government. When the mission reached Lhasa, the Dalai Lama had already fled to Urga in Mongolia, but a treaty known as the Treaty of Lhasa was signed by lay and ecclesasiastical officials of the Tibetan government, and by representatives of the three monasteries of Sera, Drepung, and Ganden. The treaty made provisions for the frontier between Sikkim and Tibet to be respected, for freer trade between British and Tibetan subjects, and for an indemnity to be paid from the Tibetan Government to the British Government for its expenses in dispatching armed troops to Lhasa. It also made provision for a British trade agent to reside at the trade mart at Gyantse. The provisions of this 1904 treaty were confirmed in a 1906 treaty signed between Britain and China, in which the British also agreed "not to annex Tibetan territory or to interfere in the administration of Tibet." The position of British Trade Agent at Gyantse was occupied from 1904 up until 1944. It was not until 1937, with the creation of the position of "Head of British Mission Lhasa", that a British officer had a permanent posting in Lhasa itself. (McKay, 1997, p. 230-1).

== Republican period ==
In 1912, in the aftermath of the Xinhai Revolution, despite Chinese troops having withdrawn from Tibet, the Republic of China officially maintained that Tibet was an integral part of China but did not attempt to re-occupy it. In 1913, Tibet and the Bogd Khanate of Mongolia signed a treaty proclaiming their independence from China, and their mutual recognition. In 1914 a treaty was negotiated in India, the Simla Convention, representatives of China, Tibet and Britain participated. Again, Chinese suzerainty over Tibet was recognized and a boundary negotiated between British India and Tibet which was very generous to Britain. The treaty was never signed by the Chinese and thus never came into force. The Chinese raised a number of objections, especially their refusal to recognize any treaty between Tibet and Britain. The subsequent outbreak of the world wars and civil war in China caused distractions for the major powers and China, and the Tibetan government continued to exercise effective control over much of the historic lands of Tibet until 1950 despite endemic war with China on its eastern frontier during much of that period.

=== Relations with Britain ===
During most of the Republican period Tibet looked to Britain for diplomatic and military aid with respect to China. Military aid was given, but in only small quantities.

Following expulsion of the Chinese Tibet declared itself independent but was recognized by no nation other than Mongolia. Military clashes continued on the eastern frontier with China but a truce was called, while China, Tibet, and Britain attempted to negotiate a comprehensive settlement at Simla in India from 1913 to 1915. This was a failure with respect to China, which refused to assent to expansive Tibetan demands despite having no effective control, or even access, to most of the lands claimed by Tibet. However a successful agreement was made between Tibet and Britain which established mechanisms for trade. War continued on the eastern frontier with China until a truce was signed in October, 1918 which endured until 1930. Attempts at a settlement with China were fruitless due to Tibetan demands that China adhere to the Simla Accord and nationalist popular sentiment in China.

=== Kuomintang Pacification of Qinghai ===
The Chinese Muslim Generals Ma Qi and his son Ma Bufang, who pledged allegiance to the Chinese government, initiated a bloody campaign against Tibetans in Qinghai province to subdue the region.

=== Sino-Tibetan War ===
In 1932, the Muslim Qinghai and Han-Chinese Sichuan armies of the National Revolutionary Army led by Chinese Muslim General Ma Bufang and Han General Liu Wenhui defeated the Tibetan army in the Sino-Tibetan War when the 13th Dalai Lama tried to seize territory in Qinghai and Xikang. Ma Bufang overran the Tibetan armies and recaptured several counties in Xikang province. Shiqu, Dengke, and other counties were seized from the Tibetans. The Tibetans were pushed back to the other side of the Jinsha river. Ma and Liu warned Tibetan officials not to dare cross the Jinsha river again. Ma Bufang defeated the Tibetans at Dan Chokorgon. Several Tibetan generals surrendered, and were demoted by the Dalai Lama. By August, the Tibetans lost so much land to Liu Wenhui and Ma Bufang's forces that the Dalai Lama telegraphed the British government of India for assistance. British pressure led to Nanjing to declare a ceasefire. Separate truces were signed by Ma and Liu with the Tibetans in 1933, ending the fighting.

=== German expedition to Tibet ===
The 1938–1939 German expedition to Tibet was an expedition that arrived to Tibetan territory in 1939 and was led by Ernst Schäfer.

On September 29, this group had been observed by the British authorities in India. The expedition under the patronage of Heinrich Himmler's Ahnenerbe Institute was guided by Ernst Schäfer, an SS officer.

=== Japanese expedition to Tibet ===
At about the same time, the 1939 Japanese expedition to Tibet of the Japanese ordered Kwantung Army agents to arrive in Tibet and Xinjiang to research the country and make contact with the inhabitants. Muslim warlord Ma Bufang was also an obstruction to Japanese agents trying to contact the Tibetans, he was called an "adversary" by a Japanese agent.

=== Wartime relations with China ===
Under orders from the Kuomintang government of Chiang Kai-shek, Ma Bufang repaired Yushu airport to prevent Tibetan separatists from seeking independence. Chiang also ordered Ma Bufang to put his Muslim soldiers on alert for an invasion of Tibet in 1942. Ma Bufang complied, and moved several thousand troops to the border with Tibet. Chiang also threatened the Tibetans with bombing if they did not comply. Ma Bufang attacked the Tibetan Buddhist Tsang monastery in 1941. He also constantly attacked the Labrang monastery.

=== Wartime relations with the United States ===
The first United States mission to Tibet entrusted to Captain Ilya Tolstoy, a grandson of the novelist, a "reconnaissance mission" codenamed "FE-2" and approved by Franklin Delano Roosevelt on May 12, 1942, was sent by the OSS "...to move across Tibet and make its way to Chungking, China, observing attitudes of the people of Tibet; to seek allies and discover enemies; locate strategic targets and survey the territory as a possible field for future activity." As an aristocrat Tolstoy was well equipped to deal with the British aristocrats of the Indian Raj and the Tibetan aristocrats of Lhasa. He was accompanied by Lieutenant Brooke Dolan II who had previously engaged in extensive naturalistic explorations in Tibet on behalf of the Philadelphia Academy of Natural Science. Leaving Washington in July, 1942, the party spent 3 months in India arranging permission to visit Lhasa. Permission was granted by the Tibetan government in September, 1942 to come to Lhasa and present gifts and a letter from President Roosevelt. On their way to Lhasa the expedition made contact in Yatung with a member of the Pandatsang family of Kham which controlled Tibet's external wool trade, a major source of government revenue. Arriving in Lhasa in early December, they were granted an audience December 20, 1942 with the Dalai Lama, then only 7 years old. A letter from Franklin Roosevelt was delivered which was carefully phrased as being addressed to the Dalai Lama as a religious leader but not as the ruler of Tibet. Gifts were given to the Dalai Lama and gifts were received from the Tibetan cabinet, the Kashag. Tolstoy remained for three months but did not attempt to raise the question of transshipment of supplies to China as he could see the unfavorable attitude of the Tibetans. Tolstoy, joined by the head of the British mission in Tibet, Frank Ludlow, may have intimated to the Tibetans during this period that Tibet would be permitted to send a delegation to the postwar peace conference, an unauthorized representation both knew would not be supported by their respective governments. The Tibetans, on their quarter, were enthusiastic about the prospect. Permission was granted to Tolstoy and Dolan to continue on to China. The expedition, accompanied by a monk, a Tibetan official, and 5 Tibetan soldiers, left Lhasa in late February bound for China. Tolstoy arrived at Lanzhou in late June, 1943.

Little was accomplished as a result of the Tolstoy expedition other than establishing contact and the gathering of intelligence; although, a substantial report was prepared by Tolstoy and Donal on the geography, facilities, and people encountered on their journey as well as many photographs. Contacts made would prove useful later when the CIA offered aid to Tibetan rebels. Serious consideration was given to using a route over the Tibetan Plateau, but as the amount that could be transported by pack train was minuscule, and the agreement of both the Chinese and Tibetans would have to be obtained, the idea was abandoned in summer, 1944. However a small import quota was granted to Tibetan wool dealers by the United States and the promised three radio transmitters and six receivers were delivered to the Tibetan government in 1944; although great difficulty was encountered in setting them up and using them due to lack of trained technicians. While in Tibet, Tolstoy and the British resident had raised the possibility that Tibet might participate in post-war conferences. This never came to fruition as both Britain and the United States, in consideration of their relations with China, continued to take the position that Tibet was not a sovereign country.

The subject of Tibet arose briefly in international affairs in 1942–43 as a result efforts by the U.S. to fly aid to China over the Himalayas following the closure of the Burma Road. An America plane crashed in Tibet, and its five crew members were escorted back to India. The U.S. sent a mission to Lhasa led by Captain Ilya Tolstoy to study the possibility of an air supply route crossing Tibetan territory. Although the project was not pushed any further, it created a need to clarify Tibet's status in international law. In 1942, US State Department formally notified the Chinese government based in wartime capital Chungking (Chongqing) that it had at no time raised any doubt about the Chinese sovereignty claim over Tibet. In 1995, US State Department reiterated its position during the hearing before the Senate Foreign Relations Committee:

"The United States considers the Tibet Autonomous Region or TAR (hereinafter referred to as "Tibet") as part of the People's Republic of China. This longstanding policy is consistent with the view of the entire international community, including all China's neighbors: no country recognizes Tibet as a sovereign state. Moreover, U.S. acceptance of China's claim of sovereignty over Tibet predates the establishment of the People's Republic of China. In 1942, we told the Nationalist Chinese government then headquartered in Chongqing (Chungking) that we had "at no time raised (a) question" over Chinese claims to Tibet."

British Foreign Secretary Anthony Eden accordingly wrote a note presented to the Chinese government which describes Tibet as, "an autonomous State under the suzerainty of China" that "enjoyed de facto independence." Meanwhile, the British embassy in Washington told the U.S. State Department that, "Tibet is a separate country in full enjoyment of local autonomy, entitled to exchange diplomatic representatives with other powers." Although London repeatedly asked the United States for assistance, the U.S. State Department refuted London's claim:

"For its part, the Government of the United States has borne in mind the fact that the Chinese Government has long claimed suzerainty over Tibet and that the Chinese constitution lists Tibet among areas constituting the territory of the Republic of China. This Government has at no time raised a question regarding either of these claims."

=== Postwar diplomatic efforts ===
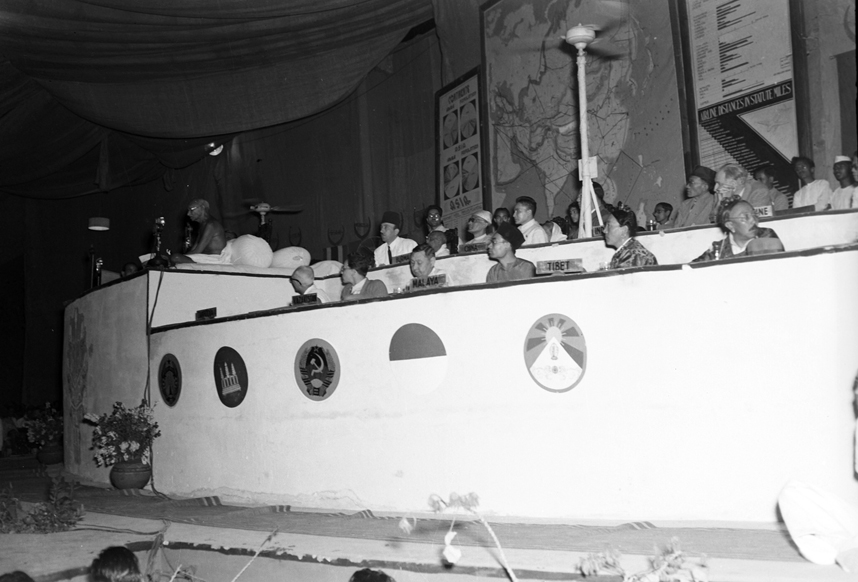
Two Tibetan delegates (front right) during the Asian Relations Conference in Delhi in 1947 as Mahatma Gandhi speaks (far left). A Tibetan flag is seen in front of them along with flags of other participating countries. Mahatma Gandhi addressing the closing Plenery Session of the Asian Relations Conference. The delegate from China is above and to the left dressed in white.

In October, 1945 the Tibetan cabinet and senior clerics prepared a diplomatic mission to India and China. Gifts were prepared and letters congratulating the successful belligerents were carefully drafted. The mission arrived in New Delhi in March, 1946 where gifts and letters were presented to the British viceroy and to the American diplomatic mission. After a delay, perhaps occasioned by British diplomatic reluctance, they proceeded to Nanking where a carefully crafted letter to Chiang Kai-shek was presented which asserted an expansive claim of independence. The Chinese were unresponsive and the delegation left Nanking in March, 1947 without formally acknowledging Chinese sovereignty as the Chinese requested. They were invited to an international conference of Asian countries in India in fall, 1946 and were seated, displayed their national flag and participated in the conference; this conference, however, was not a formal diplomatic event.

The letters to the United States, after long delay, were translated and dispatched to Washington along with a favorable note from U.S. charge dé affairs in New Delhi which stressed the potential strategic importance of Tibet. Washington was having none of that, however, and while encouraging scouting trips to Lhasa if the occasion should arise, deprecated efforts to establish a diplomatic relationship with Tibet.

=== The trade delegation of 1947-1949 ===
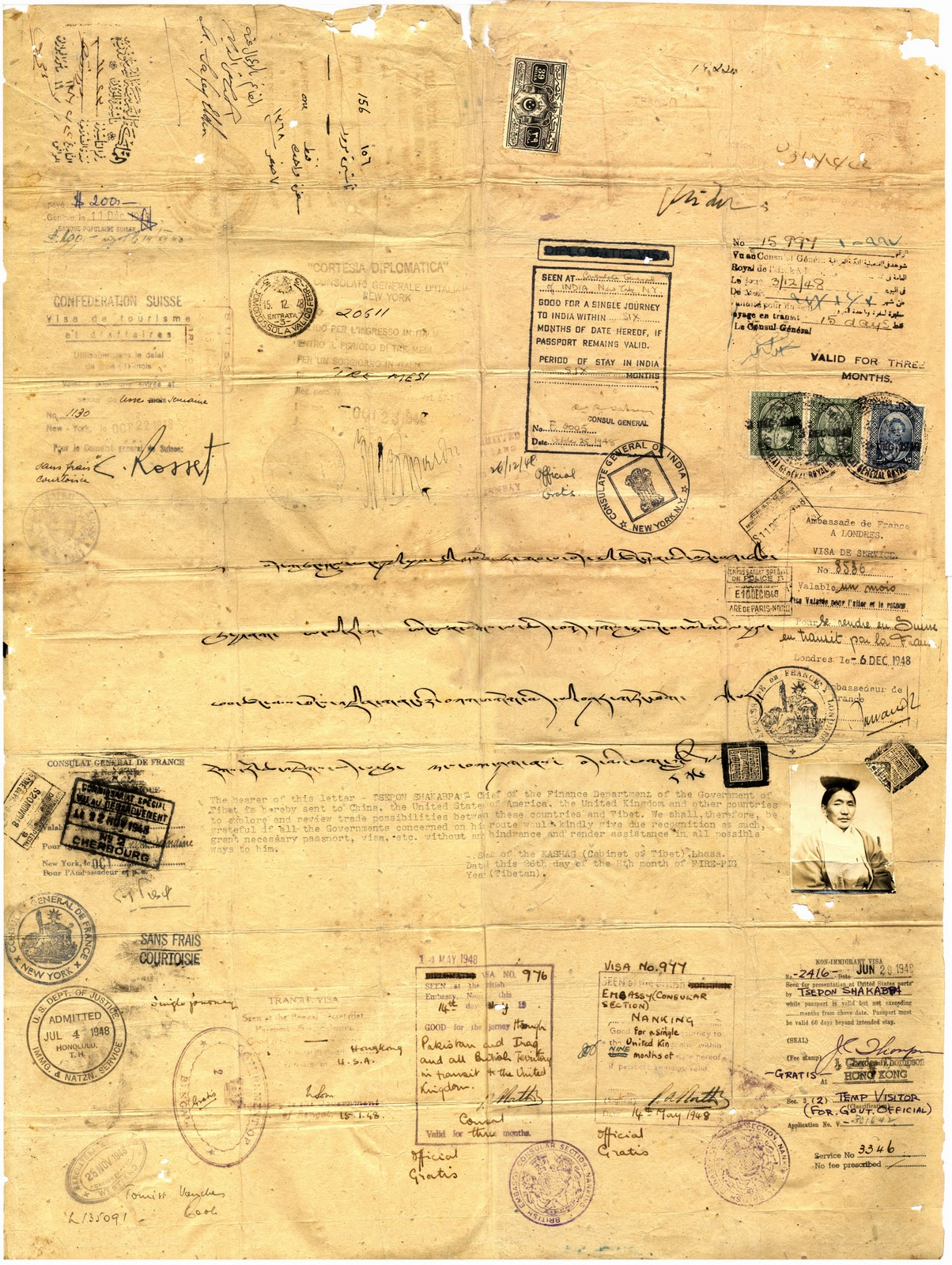
The passport of Tsepon Shakabpa, Chief of the Finance Department of the Government of Tibet and head of the trade delegation

In 1947 the Tibetan foreign office began planning a trade delegation to visit India, China, the United States and Britain. Initial overtures were made to the US embassy in India requesting meetings with President Truman and other US officials to discuss trade. This request was forwarded to Washington, but the State Department proved willing only to meet with the Tibetans on an informal basis. The delegation consisted of 4 persons, Tsepon Shakabpa, Tibet's Chief of the Finance Department, Padatsang, and two others including a monk.

Armed with the first Tibetan passports, the delegation went first to New Delhi, meeting with Prime Minister Nehru and Mahatma Gandhi. Most foreign trade from Tibet passed through India, and it was the practice of the Indian government to convert any foreign currencies received into rupees before payment to Tibet. The Tibetans were unable to negotiate any change in this practice, which would have put hard currency into their hands. One of the goals of the trade delegation was to obtain gold or other solid backing for Tibetan currency.

It was the Chinese position that a Chinese passport was required for entry into China. These were issued, and the delegation entered China at Hong Kong, using them and spent 3 months in China. For the next leg of the journey to the United States and Britain, the Chinese took the position that they would only issue exit visas on the Chinese passports. However the Tibets managed to get a British consular officer in Nanking to issue a British visa on their Tibetan passports, and, again, a US officer in Hong Kong, thus defeating the efforts of the US State Department and the British Foreign Office to deny use of the Tibetan passports, a small victory.

The delegation arrived in San Francisco in July, 1948 where they were met by the British Consul. They traveled by train to Washington where, despite strong objections by the Chinese and reassurance that the United States recognized China's de jure sovereignty over Tibet, the Tibetans were received by the Secretary of State, George Marshall. There was some language in the State Department's negotiations with the Chinese which noted that they exerted no de facto control over Tibet and noted the traditional American principle of favoring self-determination, but no more definite statement was made regarding Tibetan sovereignty.

They requested aid from the United States in convincing India to free up their hard currency earning and also for permission to purchase gold from the United States for a currency reserve. They received no help on their problem with India but were given permission to purchase up to 50,000 ounces of gold.

Not meeting with President Truman, they proceeded to New York where they were greeted by their old friend, Ilya Tolstoy, who introduced them around. They met with Lowell Thomas, who was interested in visiting Tibet, and Dwight Eisenhower, then president of Columbia University, and other eastern establishment personalities as well as Prince Peter of Greece and Denmark who had an interest in Tibet.

In November the delegation set sail for Britain where they spent 3 weeks but were received coolly. Returning through India they were able to free up some foreign exchange for the purchase of gold and, adding money of their own, effected a purchase of $425,800 in gold which was transported to Tibet by pack animals.

Being received more warmly in the United States than in Britain, with whom they had a long established relationship, set the stage for later expansion of the relationship with the United States as they attempted to deal with later Chinese efforts to reassert effective control.

== People's Republic of China ==
Neither the Nationalist government of the Republic of China (ROC as well as its successor in Taiwan) nor the People's Republic of China (PRC) have ever renounced China's claim to sovereignty over Tibet. The PRC ascribes Tibetan efforts to establish independence as due to the machinations of "British imperialism" 系统维护_中华人民共和国外交部. According to the Chinese, the Tibetan cabinet, the Kashag, set up a "bureau of foreign affairs" in July, 1942 and demanded that the Chinese mission in Lhasa, the Office of the Mongolian and Tibetan Affairs Commission, deal only with it. The Chinese successfully withstood this.

In 1950 the People's Liberation Army entered Tibet, meeting little resistance from the small and ill-equipped Tibetan army. In 1951 the 17 Point Agreement, signed under threat of a wholesale Chinese invasion by representatives of the Dalai Lama and the Panchen Lama, formally incorporated central or political Tibet into PRC territory. This agreement was successfully put into effect in Tibet but in June 1956, rebellion broke out in the Tibetan populated borderlands of Amdo and Kham when the government tried to impose the socialist transformation policies in these regions that they had in other provinces of China. Since Amdo and Kham had not been under the control of Lhasa in 1950 but under the control of Chinese warlords, they were not considered by the Chinese to be part of Tibet and thus not subject to the "go slow" agreement. This unrest provided the opportunity for the CIA to support an armed Tibetan rebellion which eventually spread to Lhasa. The rebellion was crushed by 1959 and the Dalai Lama fled in disguise to India. Isolated actions continued until 1969. The Panchen Lama was set up as a figurehead in Lhasa while the Dalai Lama eventually created a Government of Tibet in Exile.

The Battle of Chamdo in 1950 resulted in a flurry of diplomatic activity as Tibet attempted to negotiate with the Chinese government, appealed futilely to the international community, and then was forced to capitulate.

Prior to the Chinese attack on Tibetan army positions in Kham on October 5, 1950, the Tibetan government contacted the Chinese government privately through the Dalai Lama's older brother's father in law and received a reply from China agreeing to meet with the Tibetan delegation in Hong Kong.

Countries today recognize Tibet as a part of the PRC.

== Notes ==
- Allen, Charles (2004), Duel in the Snows: The True Story of the Younghusband Mission to Lhasa, John Murray Press, ISBN 0-7195-5427-6
  - Allen, Charles (2015), Duel in the Snows: The True Story of the Younghusband Mission to Lhasa, John Murray Press, ISBN 978-1-4736-2754-3
- Bell, Charles (1924), Tibet Past and Present (First ed.), Oxford University Press
  - Bell, Charles (1992). Tibet Past and Present. CUP Motilal Banarsidass Publ. ISBN 81-208-1048-1.
- Carrington, Michael. 'Officers Gentlemen and Thieves: The Looting of Monasteries during the 1903/4 Younghusband Mission to Tibet' Modern Asian Studies, 37, 1, (2003) pp. 81–109. (Cambridge University Press).
- McKay, Alex (1997), Tibet and the British Raj: The Frontier Cadre, 1904-1947, Psychology Press, ISBN 978-0-7007-0627-3 – via archive.org
- Mehra, Parshotam (1990), "The Elusive Triangle: Tibet in India-China Relations—A Brief Conspectus", China Report, 26 (2): 145–156, doi:10.1177/000944559002600202, S2CID 153780081
- Knaus, John Kenneth (1999), Orphans of the Cold War: America and the Tibetan Struggle for Survival, Perseus, ISBN 1-891620-18-5
- Richardson, Hugh E. (1984), Tibet and its History (Second ed.), Boulder/London: Shambala, ISBN 9780877737896
- Shaumian, Tatiana. Tibet : The Great Game and Tsarist Russia, Delhi: Oxford University Press, 2000, hardcover, 223 pages, ISBN 0-19-565056-5
