= Expedition to Tibet =

Expedition to Tibet can refer to:

== Chinese expeditions ==
- Battle of the Salween River (1718)
- Chinese expedition to Tibet (1720)
- Qianlong's Expedition to Lhasa (1750)
- Sino-Nepalese War (1788–1792)
- Chinese expedition to Tibet (1910)
- Battle of Chamdo (1950)

== Other expeditions ==
- 1938–1939 German expedition to Tibet
- 1939 Japanese expedition to Tibet
- Bakhtiyar Khalji's Tibet campaign (1206)
- British expedition to Tibet, also known as the Younghusband expedition (1903–1904)
- Mongol invasions of Tibet (1206–1273)

== See also ==
- Invasion of Tibet (disambiguation)
- Sino-Tibetan War (disambiguation)
- Timeline of Mount Everest expeditions
