= 1938–1939 German expedition to Tibet =

Research Expedition (1938–1939)

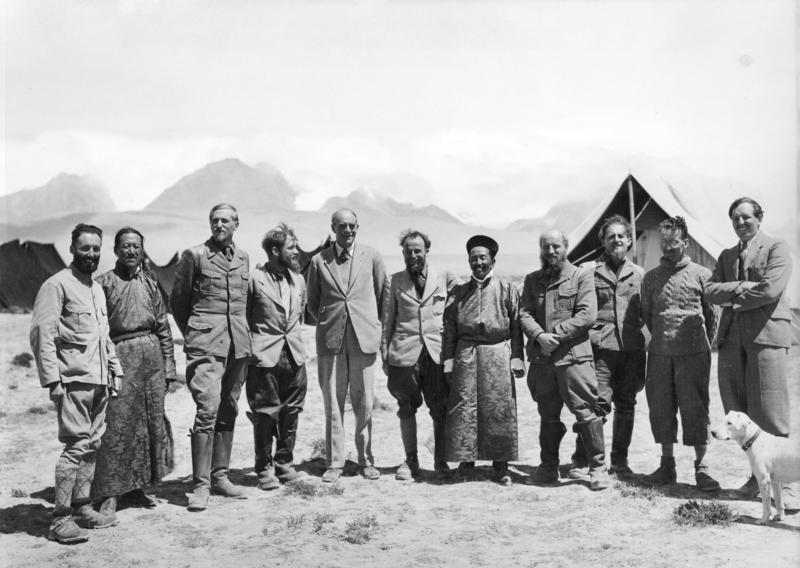
Expedition members with hosts in Gangtok, Sikkim – from left to right: unknown, unknown Tibetan (Sikkimese bhutia man?), Bruno Beger, Ernst Schäfer, Sir Basil Gould, Krause, unknown Sikkimese bhutia man, Karl Wienert, Edmund Geer, unknown, unknown

The 1938–1939 German expedition to Tibet, a German scientific expedition, took place in Tibet between April 1938 and August 1939 under the leadership of the German zoologist and SS-officer Ernst Schäfer.

== Origins ==
Nazi Reichsführer-SS Heinrich Himmler wished to use the reputation of the scientist and explorer Ernst Schäfer for Nazi propaganda after Schäfer's first two trips to China and Tibet in 1930 to 1931 and 1934 to 1936 came to Himmler's attention. Himmler asked about Schäfer's future plans. Schäfer responded that he wanted to lead another expedition to Tibet and requested that his expedition be under the patronage of the cultural department of the Foreign Affairs Department or of the Deutsche Forschungsgemeinschaft ("German Research Foundation"). Himmler was fascinated by Asian mysticism and therefore wished to send such an expedition under the auspices of the SS Ahnenerbe (SS Ancestral Heritage Society), and he desired for Schäfer to perform research based on Hanns Hörbiger's pseudoscientific theory of "Glacial Cosmogony", promoted by the Ahnenerbe. Schäfer had scientific objectives and therefore refused to include Edmund Kiss, an adept of the theory, in his team and required 12 conditions to ensure scientific freedom. Wolfram Sievers, from the Ahnenerbe, therefore expressed criticism concerning the objectives of the expedition, and Ahnenerbe would not sponsor it. Himmler was agreeable to the expedition going ahead if all members joined the SS, and Schäfer found that he had no alternative but to accept that condition even without sponsorship.

== Designations ==
While he prepared the expedition, Schäfer used the term "Schaefer Expedition 1938/1939" on his letterhead and to apply for sponsorship from businessmen. The official expedition name had to be changed by order of the Ahnenerbe, however, to German Tibet-Expedition Ernst Schaefer (in capital letters), "under the patronage of the Reichsführer-SS Himmler and in connection with the Ahnenerbe" (in small letters).

After the German Consul-General in Calcutta had criticized the letterhead in a report to the German Foreign Office by "arguing that the prescribed letterhead was counter-productive and immediately generated mistrust among the British," Schäfer "ordered a new, discreet letterhead in Antiqua font, which read 'Deutsche Tibet Expedition Ernst Schäfer'." During the expedition, Schäfer used only the latter letterhead or his original "Schaefer Expedition" paper. The Ahnenerbe-prescribed letterhead was used only prior to the expedition's departure.

The British writer Christopher Hale claims that one cannot infer that Schäfer was independent of the SS and could do "pure science" simply from the special letterhead that he got printed for the expedition. To all intents and purposes, the expedition remained under Himmler's patronage, and Schäfer had no interest in losing his support.

In its time, the expedition was also commonly referred to in German newspapers and academic journals as the "SS Tibet Expedition", as it had Himmler as its patron, and all five members were SS officers. The "SS Tibet Expedition" designation was used by Schäfer himself in the Atlantis Journal. "SS Tibet Expedition" is the title used in a 1946 report by US military intelligence in Western Europe.

In the "Register of the Heinrich Himmler Papers", 1914–1944, archived at Stanford University's Hoover institution, the folder containing the material pertaining to the expedition bears the title "The SS-Tibet-Expedition, 1939".

That designation is still in use by modern scholars, such as Mechtild Rössler in 2001, and Suzanne Heim in 2002, as well as by the writer Peter Lavenda in 2002.

== Funding ==
According to Christopher Hale, Schäfer was demanding more than 60,000 Reichsmarks for his expedition, and the coffers of the SS were depleted at the time. He was therefore forced to raise the funds himself.

According to researcher Isrun Engelhardt, the expedition was not funded by the Ahnenerbe. Schäfer raised the funds by himself, 80% of which came from the Public Relations and Advertising Council of German Industry (Werberat der deutschen Wirtschaft) as well as large German business enterprises, German Research Foundation (Deutsche Forschungsgemeinschaft) and Brooke Dolan II. Himmler's personal friends sponsored only the flight back to Germany.

According to the United States, the expedition's funding was provided by various public and private contributors, with the return flight to Germany being paid for by the SS. The cost of equipping the expedition was RM 65,000, and the expedition itself cost another RM 65,000, excluding the flight back.

== Members ==
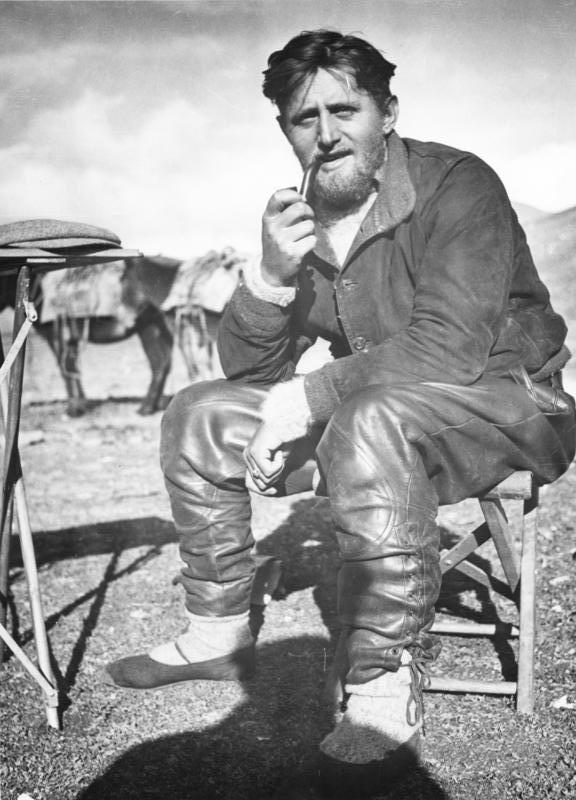
Edmund Geer in Tibet, 1938

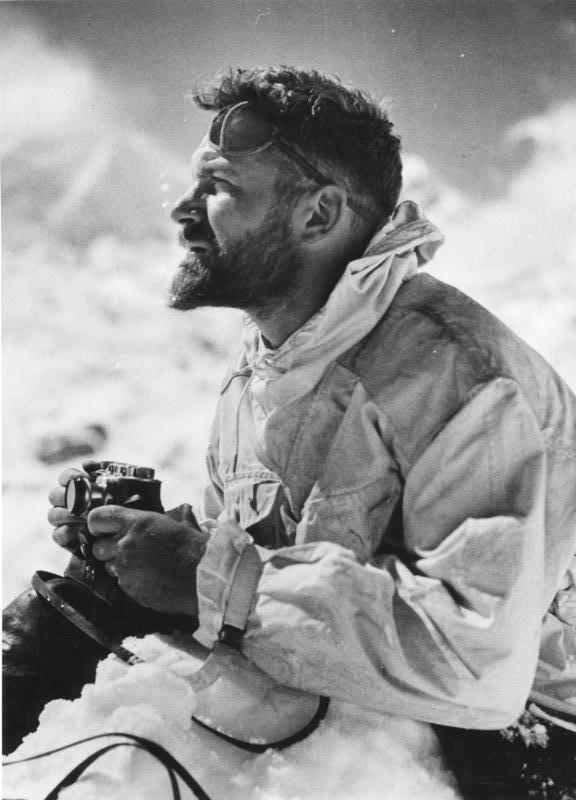
Ernst Schäfer in Tibet, 1938

Ernst Schäfer was a member of the SS when he arrived at the German consulate in Chongqing in 1935. He had just returned from a trip through parts of Asia, mainly India and China, in which the two other heads of the expedition had abandoned him out of fear of the native tribes. Schäfer turned the expedition from a complete failure into a great success, and the SS took note by sending him a letter informing him of a promotion to SS-Untersturmführer and summoning him back to Germany from Philadelphia, Pennsylvania. In June 1936, Schäfer met with Himmler, who informed Sievers and Galke to start organizing an expedition to Tibet.

Schäfer recruited young, fit men who would be well suited for an arduous journey. At 24, Karl Wienert (an assistant of Wilhelm Filchner, a famous explorer) was the team's geologist. Also 24, Edmund Geer was selected as the technical leader to organize the expedition. A relatively old teammate, who was 38, was Ernst Krause (not to be confused with the German biologist of the same name), who was to double as a filmmaker and an entomologist. Bruno Beger was a 26-year-old Rassekunde expert and student of Hans F.K. Günther and was to be the team's anthropologist.

== Objectives ==
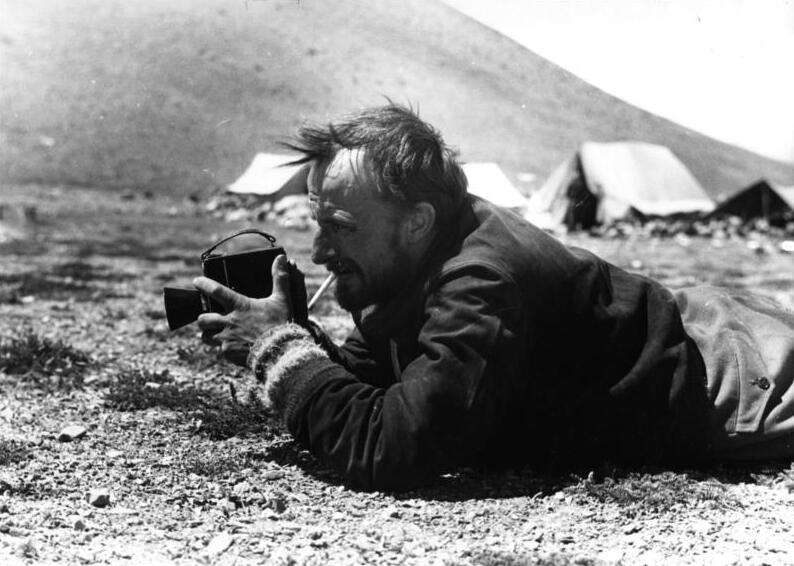
Ernst Krause filming blue vetch

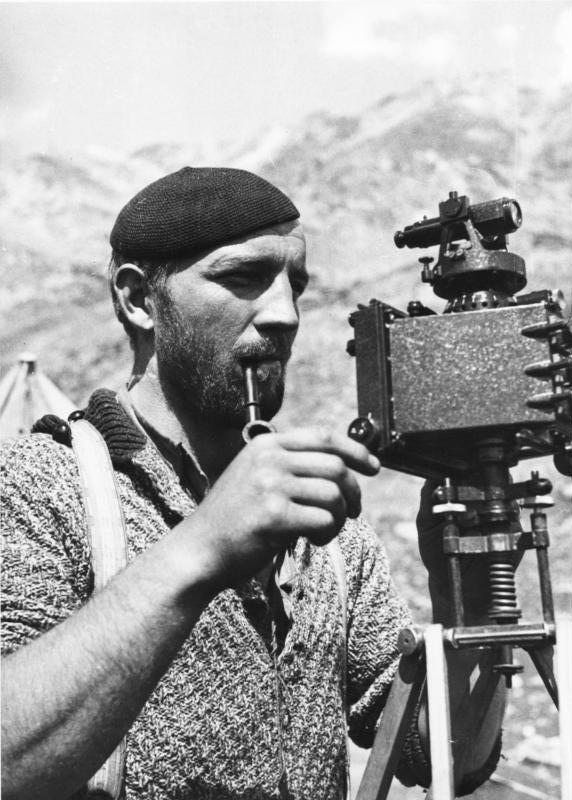
Karl Wienert taking photogrammetric measurements

The researcher Roger Croston described the objective of the expedition as "an holistic creation of a complete biological record of Tibet alongside a synthesis of inter-relating natural sciences with regard to geography, cartography, geology, earth magnetics, climate, plants, animals and mankind."

Reacting to Dr Isrun Engelhardt's conclusions that the Schäfer expedition was "purely scientific" and her claim that the historical context of Germany in the 1930s made the expedition's goals appear as somehow sinister, the British writer Christopher Hale observed that "while the idea of ‘Nazi botany’ or ‘Nazi ornithology’ is probably absurd, other sciences are not so innocent – and Schäfer's small expedition represented a cross-section of German science in the 1930s." To Hale, that has considerable significance as "under the Third Reich anthropology and medicine were cold-bloodedly exploited to support and enact a murderous creed." There have been allegations that one of the expedition's purposes was to determine whether Tibet was the cradle of the "Aryan race". The taking of cranial measurements and the making of facial casts of local people by the anthropologist Bruno Beger did little to dissipate those allegations.

However, Croston agreed with Engelhardt and stated that the expedition "was planned as a scientific mission [...] but it was caught up in the politics of the time.[...] Schaefer’s vehement refusal to accept Himmler’s plans led, eventually, to the expedition not being sponsored by Himmler’s SS or its organisations 'because it would lie outside the scope of his work'."

According to the American journalist Karl E. Meyer, one of the expedition's aims was to prepare maps and survey passes "for possible use of Tibet as a staging ground for guerrilla assaults on British India."

The Italian essayist Claudio Mutti stated that the official plan included research on the landforms, climate, geography, and culture of the region, and contacting the local authorities for the establishment of representation in the country.

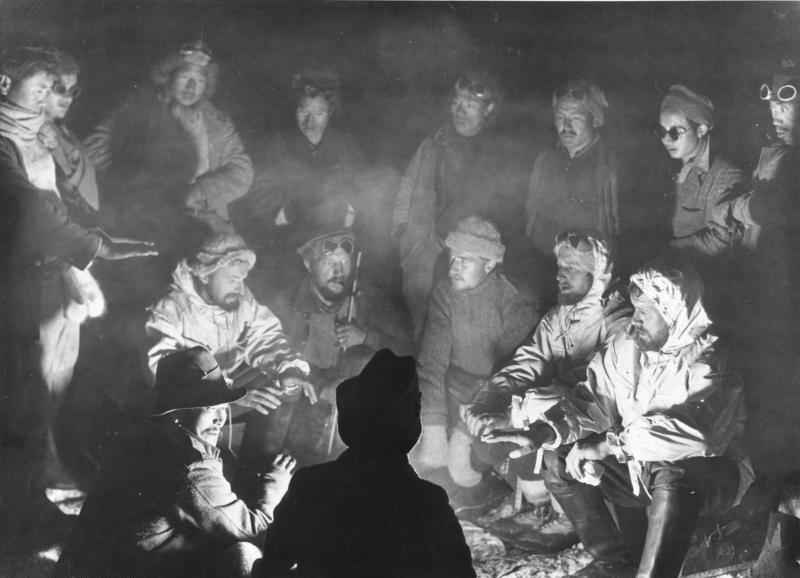
Photograph of the expedition

According to Claudio Mutti, the group of five researchers intended to contact the Regent of Tibet and to visit the sacred cities of Lhasa and Shigatse. Even with wartime difficulties, the group contacted the Tibetan authorities and people. They returned to Germany with a complete edition of the Tibetan sacred text the Kangyur (108 volumes), examples of Mandala, other ancient texts, and an alleged document regarding the "Aryan race". The documents were kept in the Ahnenerbe archives.

The Tibetans wanted to establish friendly contacts with Germany in order to balance the influence of Britain, while Nazi leaders were interested in investigating the geographical origin of pure-blooded Aryans.

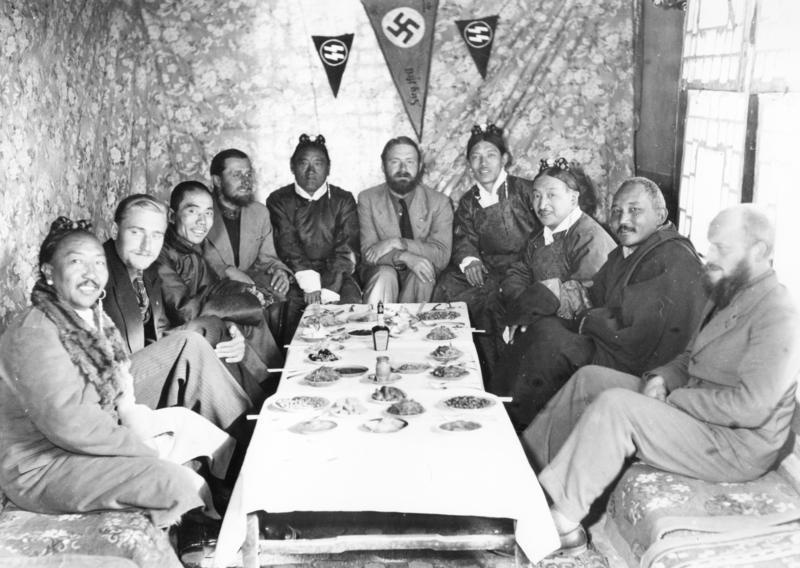
Under SS pennants and a swastika, the expedition members are entertaining some Tibetan dignitaries and the Chinese representative in Lhasa. Left: Beger, Chang Wei-pei Geer; in the centre: Tsarong Dzasa, Schäfer; right: Wienert, Möndro (Möndo).

== Details ==
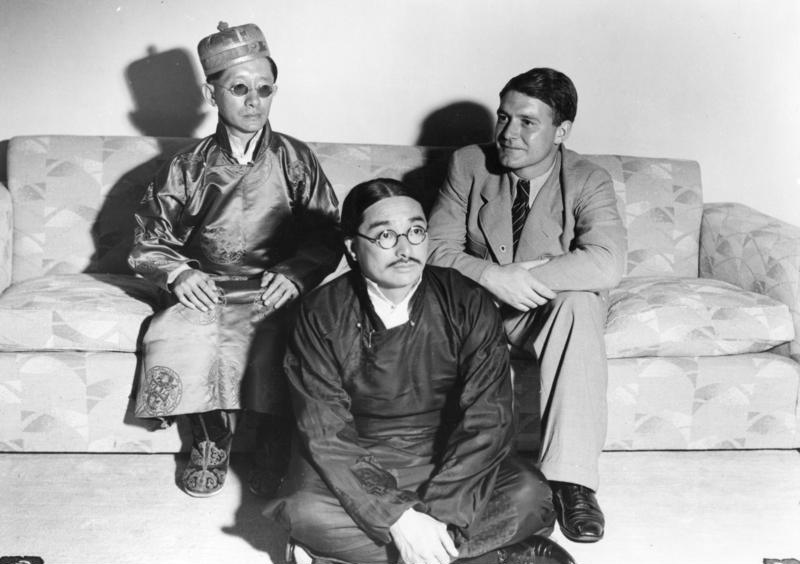
Ernst Schäfer with Tashi Namgyal (Maharaja of Sikkim) and Tashi Dadul General Secretary to the Chogyal

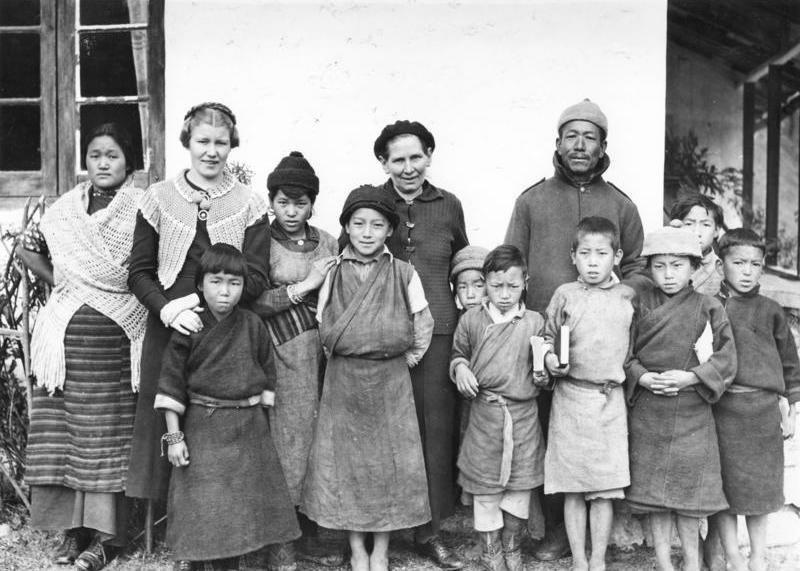
Mission school in Lachen, a Finnish missionary with her assistant and a native pastor

In July 1937, the Second Sino-Japanese War broke out, which ruined Schäfer's plans to use the Yangtze River to reach Tibet. Schäfer flew to London to seek permission to travel through India but was turned down by the British government, which feared an imminent war with Germany.

Another problem in the preparations for the Tibetan expedition occurred during a duck hunting accident on November 9, 1937, when Schäfer, his wife of four months and two servants were in a rowboat. A sudden wave caused Schäfer to drop his gun which broke in two and discharged, mortally wounding his wife. Despite subsequent emotional problems, Schäfer was back to work on the expedition in eight weeks.

In a move that lost the Ahnenerbe's support, Schäfer asked Himmler for permission simply to arrive in India and to try to force his way into Tibet. Himmler agreed with the plan and set about furthering it by contacting influential people, including German Foreign Minister Joachim von Ribbentrop. On April 21, 1938, the team departed from Genoa, Italy, on their way to Ceylon, where they would then travel to Calcutta, British India.

The day before the team had left Europe, the Völkischer Beobachter ran an article on the expedition, which alerted British officials to its intentions. Schäfer and Himmler were enraged. Schäfer complained to SS headquarters and Himmler in turn wrote to British Admiral Barry Domvile, who was a Nazi sympathiser. Domvile sent the letter to British Prime Minister Neville Chamberlain, who permitted Schäfer's team to enter Sikkim, a region bordering Tibet.

=== Journey through Sikkim ===
In Sikkim's capital of Gangtok, the team assembled a 50-mule caravan and searched for porters and Tibetan interpreters. There, British official Sir Basil Gould observed them and described Schäfer as "interesting, forceful, volatile, scholarly, vain to the point of childishness, disregardful of social convention". Gould noted that Schäfer was determined to enter Tibet regardless of permission.

The team began its journey on June 21, 1938, traveled through the Teesta River valley, and then headed north. Krause worked light traps to capture insects, Wienert toured the hills to make measurements, Geer collected bird species and Beger offered locals medical help in exchange for allowing him to take measurements of them.

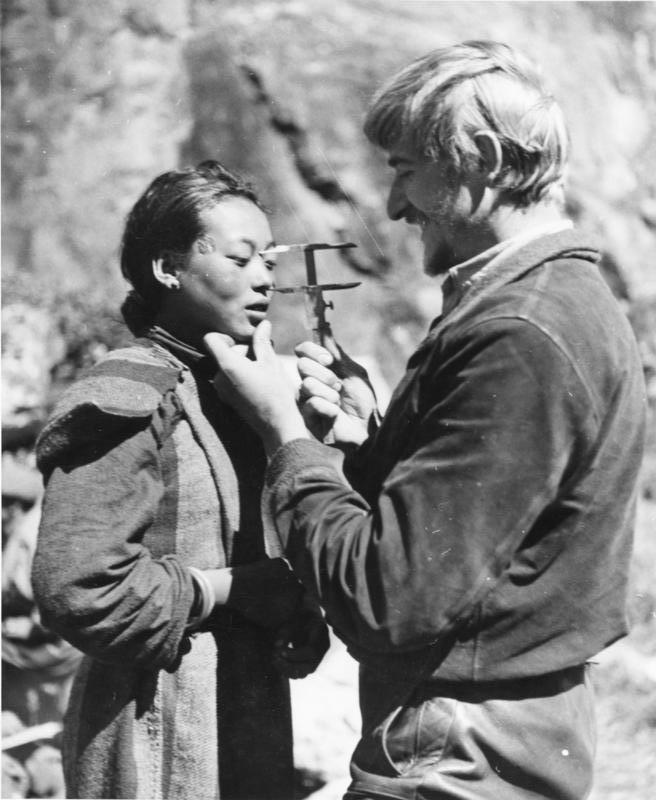
Beger busy taking cranial measurements

In August 1938, a high official of the Rajah Tsering, a member of the Sikkimese royal family living in Tibet, entered the team's camp. Although Beger wished to ask the guest's permission to measure him, he was dissuaded by the Tibetan porters, who encouraged him to wait for Schäfer to return from a hunting trip. Schäfer met with the official and presented him with mule-loads of gifts.

In December 1938, the Tibetan council of ministers invited Schäfer and his team to Tibet but forbade them from killing any animals during their stay by citing religious concerns. After a supply trip back to Gangtok, Schäfer learned he had been promoted to SS-Hauptsturmführer, and the rest of the team had been promoted to SS-Obersturmführer.

=== Trip to Lhasa ===
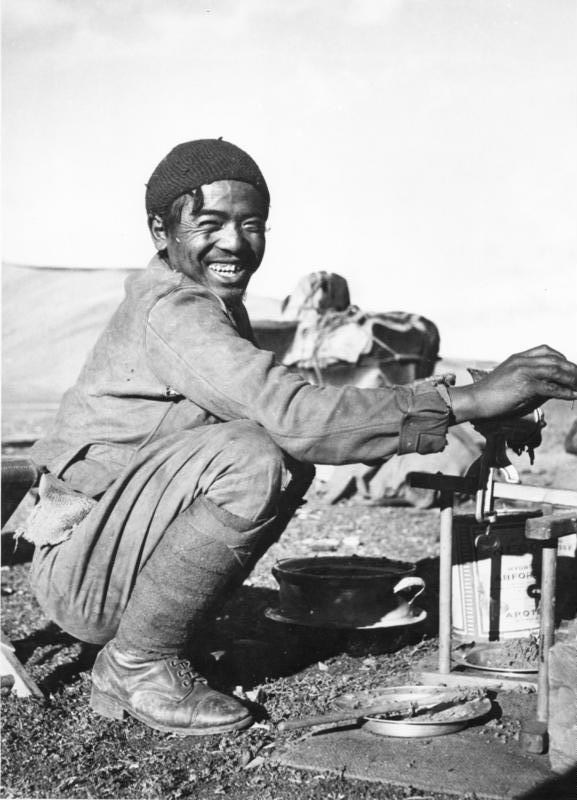
A Sherpa labeled Passang

During the trip to Tibet's highlands, Beger began making facial casts of local people, including his personal servant, a Nepalese Sherpa named Passang. During the first casting, paste got into one of Passang's nostrils and he panicked, which tore at the mask. Schäfer threatened to terminate the employment of the porters who had seen the incident if they told anyone. Most of the Tibetans had a much more friendly and light-hearted attitude, however, and photographic and film footage remains of smiling and laughing Tibetans undergoing facial and skull feature measurements.

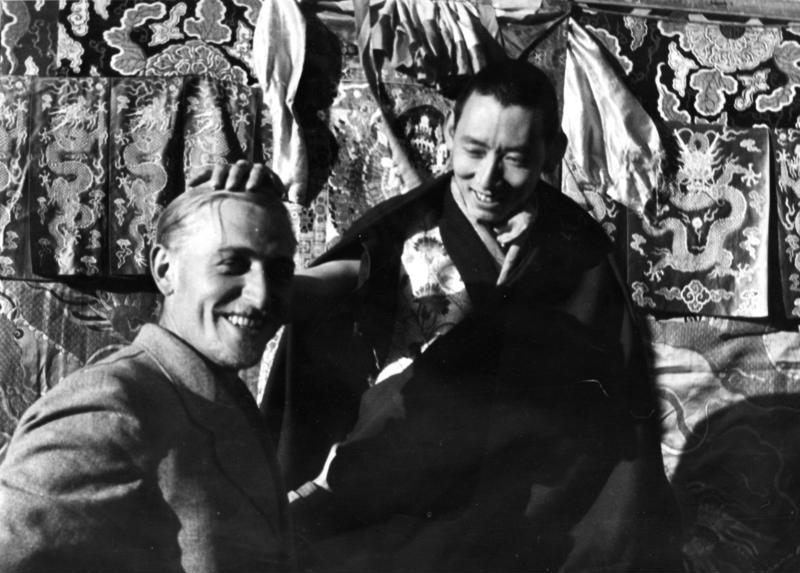
Beger with the Regent of Tibet, in Lhasa

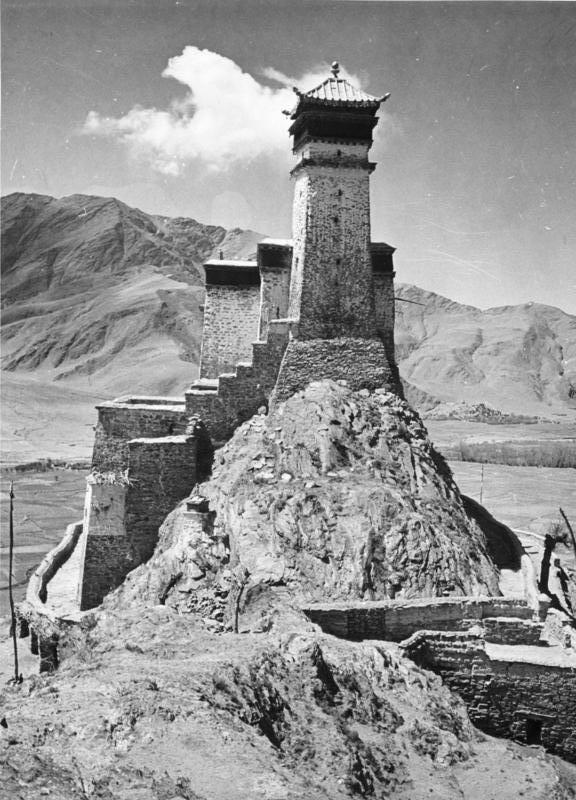
The Yumbulagang fortress as photographed by Ernst Krause in 1938

On January 19, 1939, the team reached Lhasa, the capital of Tibet. Schäfer proceeded to pay his respects to the Tibetan ministers and a nobleman. He also gave out Nazi pennants and explained the reverence shown for the shared symbol in Germany. His permission to remain in Lhasa was extended, and he was permitted to photograph and film the region. The team spent two months in Lhasa and collected information on agriculture, culture, and religion.

As the arrival of the expedition had been announced in advance, its members, according to Bruno Beger's testimony, were welcome everywhere in Tibet and provided with all the things that they needed for their trip and sojourn. In Lhasa itself, they got into close touch with government officials and other noteworthy people.

Schäfer met the Regent of Tibet, Reting Rinpoche, on several occasions. During one of their meetings, the Regent asked him point blank whether his country would be willing to sell weapons to Tibet.

=== Trip to Gyantse and Shigatse ===
In March 1939, the expedition left Lhasa, headed for Gyantse, and was escorted by a Tibetan official. After exploring the ruins of the ancient deserted capital city of Jalung Phodrang, they reached Shigatse, the city of the panchen lamas, in April. They received a warm welcome from the locals, with thousands coming out to greet them. In a 1946 "Final Interrogation Report by American Intelligence", Schäfer claims to have met "the pro-German regent of Shigatse" (the 9th Panchen Lama had died in 1937 and the 10th was not to arrive before 1951). In May, the expedition returned to Gyantse, where negotiations were held with local British officials about the trip back to India and the transport of the expeditions's gear and collections.

== Communications with Germany ==
Throughout his stay in Lhasa, Ernst Schäfer remained in touch with Germany through mail and the Chinese Legation's radio. Himmler is reported to have followed the expedition enthusiastically, written several letters to Schäfer and even broadcast Christmas greetings to him via shortwave.

== Results of research ==
The Germans collected anything they could: thousands of artifacts, a huge number of plants and animals, including live specimens. They sent back specimens of three breeds of Tibetan dogs, rare feline species, wolves, badgers, foxes, other animals, and bird skins.

The expedition members collected a huge quantity of plants, particularly hundreds of varieties of barley, wheat, and oats. The seeds were later stored in the SS-Institute for Plant Genetics in Lannach, near Graz, Austria, a research centre run by SS botanist Heinz Brücher, who entertained hopes of using both the Tibet collection and that of the Vavilov Institute in the eastern territories to select crop plants able to withstand the climate of Eastern Europe, which was considered as part of the Nazi Lebensraum or "biotope", with a view to reaching autarky.

Wienert took four sets of geomagnetic data. Krause studied Tibetan wasps. Schäfer observed Tibetan rituals, including sky burial, and even bought some human skulls. The researchers took stills and film footage of local culture, notably the spectacular New Year celebrations in which tens of thousands of pilgrims flocked to Lhasa. Bruno Beger recorded the measurements of 376 people and took casts of the heads, faces, hands, and ears of 17 others, as well as fingerprints and handprints from another 350. To carry out his research, he posed as a physician to win the favour of Tibetan aristocrats, dispensed drugs, and tended to monks with sexually transmitted diseases.

Schäfer and other members of the 1938–1939 German expedition to Tibet conducted ethnographic and scientific research, documenting Tibetan religious practices, festivals, social hierarchy, material culture, and aspects of daily life.

Schäfer presented the results of the expedition on 25 July 1939 at the Himalaya Club Calcutta.

== Return home ==
After Schäfer had read a letter from his father who reported to him about the imminent threat of war and urged him to return to Germany as quickly as possible, Schäfer decided to return to Germany. After being given two complimentary letters, one to Hitler and the other to Himmler, Schäfer and his companions left Lhasa in August 1939. They also took with them two presents for Hitler that consisted of a Lama's robe and a hunting dog, as well as a copy of the Tibetan "Bible", the 120-volume Kangyur. They headed south to Calcutta, boarded a seaplane at the mouth of the Hooghly River, and began the journey home.

According to Engelhardt:

From Calcutta the expedition first took a British Airways seaplane to Baghdad, which developed engine trouble and was forced to make an emergency water landing in Karachi. In Baghdad they were fortunate to be able to continue their flight to Athens on a Lufthansa Ju 52. They learned a few hours later that their previous British Airways seaplane had sunk off Alexandria. A surprise awaited them in Athens, where they boarded a special new aircraft that was placed at their disposal by the German government for their safe return home.

When grilled by US military intelligence in February 1946, Schäfer stated that after his return, he had a meeting with Himmler in which he outlined his plans to launch another expedition to Tibet in case of war. The idea was to win Tibet over to the German side and to organize a resistance movement there. The project never took off.

After returning to Germany, Wienert, Krause and Geer went back to civilian life and were heard of no more. Beger worked together with August Hirt at the Reichsuniversität Straßburg. His assignment, which he carried out, was to provide the Nazi physician with a selection of detainees of diverse ethnic types from Auschwitz to serve Hirt's racial experiments.

In 1943, Schäfer was given his own institute within the Ahnenerbe. He named it "the Sven Hedin Institute for Inner Asian Research" after the Swedish explorer who visited Tibet in 1907.

Because of the war, Schäfer's writings about the trip were not published until 1950, under the title "Festival of the White Gauze Scarves: A research expedition through Tibet to Lhasa, the holy city of the god realm."

All through the expedition, Beger kept a travel diary, which was published in book form 60 years later: Mit der deutschen Tibetexpedition Ernst Schäfer 1938/39 nach Lhasa (Wiesbaden, 1998). Only 50 copies of it exist.

== See also ==
- 1939 Japanese expedition to Tibet
- Seven Years in Tibet
- German Antarctic Expedition (1938–1939)
- German Amazon-Jary-Expedition (1935–1937)
