= Sino-Tibetan (disambiguation) =

Sino-Tibetan or Chinese-Tibetan can refer to:

- Sino-Tibetan languages, a major language family of East and Southeast Asia, and of northern and northeastern South Asia.
- In comparative linguistics, any or all of the peoples speaking these languages.
- Relations between Tibet and China proper.
- Sino-Tibetan art with a Tibetan style and iconography, but usually produced in China under Imperial sponsorship
- Sino-Tibetan War; there have been several
