= Invasion of Tibet =

Invasion of Tibet may refer to:

- Bakhtiyar Khilji's Tibet campaign (1206)
- Mongol invasions of Tibet (13th century)
- Dzungar invasion of Tibet (1717)
- Chinese expedition to Tibet (1720)
- Gurkha invasions of Tibet (1788 and 1791)
- Sikh invasion of Tibet (1841–1842)
- British expedition to Tibet (1903–1904)
- Chinese expedition to Tibet (1910)
- Annexation of Tibet by the People's Republic of China (1950)
- Battle of Chamdo (1950)

== See also ==
- Expedition to Tibet (disambiguation)
