= Ernst Krause (entomologist) =

German entomologist

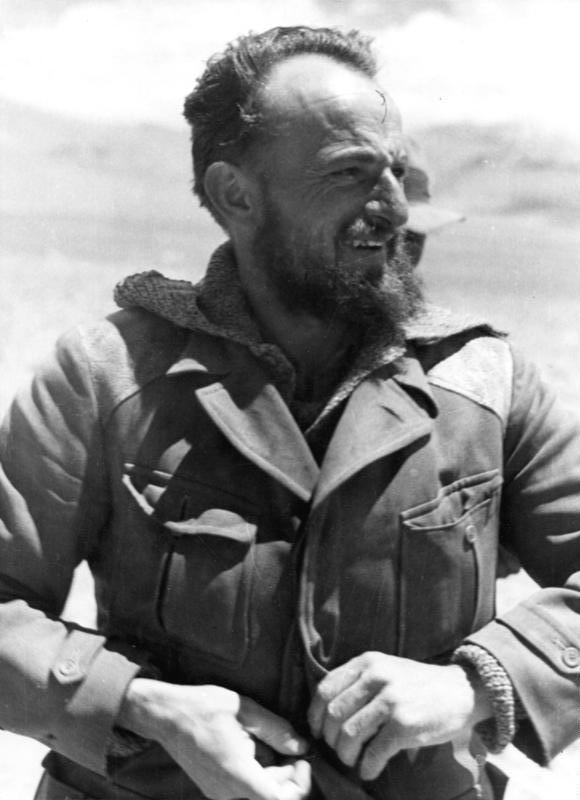
Krause in 1938 during his expedition to Tibet

Ernst Krause (1899–1987) was a German entomologist. He was born in Berlin in 1899 and was the official cameraman in Ernst Schäfer's expedition to Tibet in 1938–1939.
