= Sino-Tibetan War (disambiguation) =

Sino-Tibetan War was a 1930–32 war in East Asia.

Sino-Tibetan wars may also refer to:

- Tibetan attack on Songzhou (638)
- Battle of Dafei River (670)
- Battle of Dartsedo (1701)
- Chinese expedition to Tibet (1720)
- Chinese expedition to Tibet (1910)
- Battle of Chamdo (1950)

== See also ==
- Chinese expedition to Tibet (disambiguation)
