= Ernst Schäfer =

German zoologist (1910–1992)

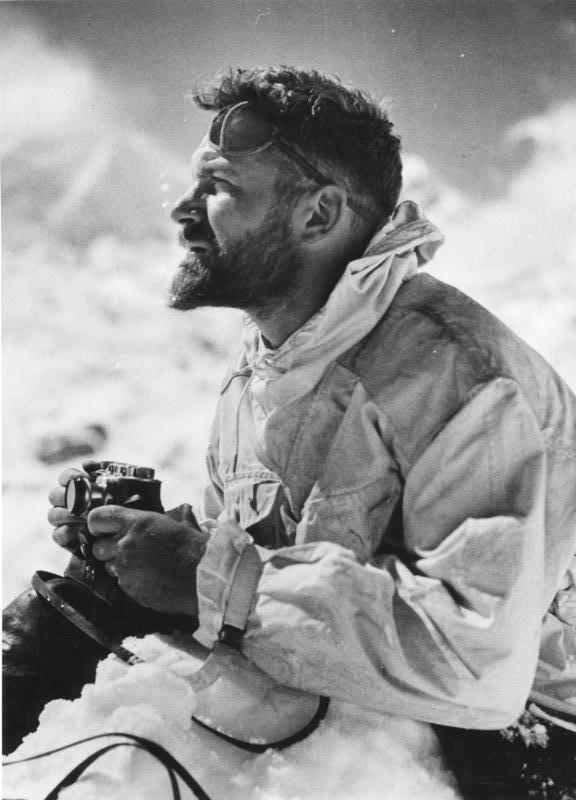
- Ernst Schäfer during his last expedition to Tibet in 1938
- Born: 14 March 1910; Cologne, German Empire
- Died: 21 July 1992 (aged 82); Bad Bevensen, Germany
- Occupation: Biologist
- Organization: Schutzstaffel
- SS career
- Allegiance: Nazi Germany
- Branch: Schutzstaffel
- Rank: Sturmbannführer
- Conflicts: World War II

Signature
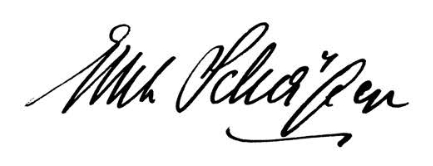

Ernst Schäfer (German pronunciation: [ˈɛʁnst ˈʃɛːfɐ]; 14 March 1910 – 21 July 1992) was a German explorer, hunter and zoologist in the 1930s, specializing in ornithology. He was also a member of Nazi Germany's pseudoscientific Ahnenerbe organization, and held the rank of an Sturmbannführer-SS.

== Early life ==
Schäfer was born in Cologne, and even as a young boy, he spent time in the outdoors shooting with an air gun and rearing birds, insects and reptiles. After high school (Abitur 1928 from Mannheim), he worked at Vogelwarten in Denmark and Heligoland. He then joined the University of Göttingen and studied zoology, botany and geology. He was a fan of the Swedish geographer Sven Hedin. He met Hugo Weigold on a study trip to Helgoland, which led him to join Weigold and American Brooke Dolan II from the Philadelphia Academy of Sciences on a trip to China in 1930–31. He published Berge, Buddhas und Bären (Mountains, Buddhas and Bears) in 1933, based on the trip and gained wide recognition. In 1934, Dolan invited Schäfer for a second trip into Tibet in 1934, which affected his studies in the University of Göttingen under Alfred Kühn. He then transferred to the Friedrich Wilhelm University in Berlin. He said the yeti was a Tibetan bear (Ursus arctos pruinosus).

Schäfer married Hertha Volz in June 1937. In November, the couple were on a duck shoot from a rocking boat when she died from an accidental gunshot. Schäfer joined the Schutzstaffel (SS) in 1933.

== Expedition ==
In 1936, he was appointed Untersturmführer in the personal staff, and in 1942 he was promoted to Sturmbannführer. He led the third expedition to Tibet in 1938–39 under the patronage of Heinrich Himmler, the SS, and various sponsors. As many as 3,300 bird specimens were collected in these expeditions. A film was produced on the expedition titled Geheimnis Tibet (Secret Tibet). Himmler was personally interested in the project due to various pet pseudo-scientific theories that he subscribed to including ideas such as human origins, and Hanns Hörbiger's Welteislehre ("World Ice Theory").

In July 1934, during his second expedition in Asia, he met the then exiled Panchen Lama, Thubten Chökyi Nyima, at a mountain temple near Hangzhou, China. He describes the Lama as a kindly, sympathetic man who enquired about how far Germany was and whether he had been waylaid by any robbers on the way.

The SS Ahnenerbe Expedition to Tibet during the 1930s was also successful for the German naturalists "Meanwhile, Ernst Schäfer and Bruno Beger, Edmund Geer and Krause carefully packed up the voluminous natural history collection- animal and bird skins; butterflies, bees, ants, wasps and other insect specimens; fragile dried plants for the herbarium; packets of seeds containing one thousand, six hundred varieties of barley, seven hundred varieties of wheat, and seven hundred varieties of oats; not to mention hundreds of seeds from other potentially useful plants." These seeds collected during the Tibetan expeditions were important, as Heinrich Himmler planned to develop hardy new varieties of crops in order to boost the agricultural yields of colonies across the captured territories of Ukraine and Crimea. Himmler ordered the Ahnenerbe to found a teaching and research institute in plant genetics, assigning the task to Dr. Ernst Schäfer, who he found to be an ideal young German zoologist who could also lead the Tibet Expedition. Schäfer set to work with characteristic vigor. He obtained a staff of seven research scientists, including a British prisoner of war, and set up an experimental research station in Lannach, near the city of Graz in Austria. There the new institute went to work, experimenting with samples of grains that Schäfer had acquired from the granaries of the Tibetan nobility.

A statue in a German private collection which has come to be called the "Iron Man" is speculated to have been obtained by Ernst Schäfer during the Tibet expedition in 1938 as part of the Tibet mission that was supported by Himmler. There is no proof that this was indeed obtained during the expedition but it has been a subject of considerable speculation. Analysis showed that it was made from iron of meteoric origin, specifically of an ataxite class, an extremely rare type, of meteorite and possibly carved from a piece of the Chinga meteorite. The statue is believed to portray the god Vaisravana. Speculation that it belongs to the pre-Buddhist Bon culture that existed in Asia about 1,000 years ago has been brought into question due to certain incoherent features of clothing and style.

In 1945, Schäfer was awarded the War Merit Cross, 2nd class with Swords. He was made an honorary member of the German ornithologists federation (DO-G) on 7 December 1939, his wedding day, a gift from Erwin Stresemann.

== Postwar career ==
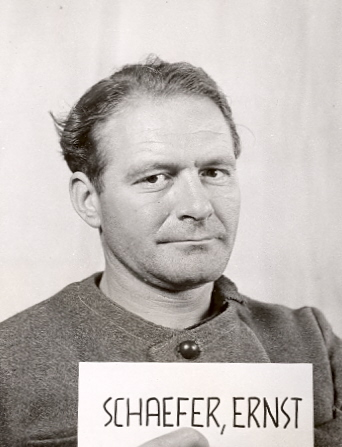
Ernst Schäfer in Allied internment

After the 1939 expedition, he returned to Germany and he married Ursula von Gartzen in December. In 1945 Schäfer was interned by the Allied Military Government but exonerated for war crimes in June 1949 and released. In 1950 he moved with his wife and daughter to Venezuela and conducted studies there while also teaching in Maracay and Caracas. He was a professor in Venezuela until 1954, when he returned to Europe to become an adviser to the Belgian ex-King Leopold III. With film-maker Heinz Sielmann, he produced Herrscher des Urwalds (Rulers of the Wild, 1958) in the Congolese forests. Schäfer served as the curator of the Department of Natural History at the Lower Saxony State Museum from 1960 until 1970.

== See also ==
- 1938–1939 German expedition to Tibet
