= Advertising Council of German Industry =

The Advertising Council of German Industry (German: Werberat der deutschen Wirtschaft) was a panel established by the Law of Commercial Advertising of 12 September 1933. Composed of knowledgeable representatives of business, it had a mandate to oversee all publicity, posters, exhibits, fairs, and advertising. The council members were appointed by the Propaganda Ministry, which thereby secured control over the content and format of all advertising campaigns. These had to be submitted to and approved by the council.

== Administrative Board ==
The opening meeting of the Administrative Board took place on October 30, 1933, at the invitation of the Reich Minister for Public Enlightenment and Propaganda Joseph Goebbels in the throne room of the former Ordenspalais in Berlin.

== Bibliography ==
- Christian Zentner, Friedemann Bedürftig (1991). The Encyclopedia of the Third Reich. Macmillan, New York. ISBN 0-02-897502-2
- Georg Goldmann: Der Werberat der deutschen Wirtschaft (Aufbau, Aufgabe, Rechtsstellung). 1938 dissertation, Universität Halle 1938, Triltsch, Würzburg 1938.
- Heinrich Hunke: Die neue Wirtschaftswerbung. Eine Grundlegung der deutschen Werbepolitik. Hanseatische Verlagsanstalt AG, Hamburg 1938.
- Dirk Reinhardt: Von der Reklame zum Marketing. Geschichte der Wirtschaftswerbung in Deutschland. 1999 dissertation, Universität Münster 1999, Berlin 1993.
- Matthias Rücker: Wirtschaftswerbung unter dem Nationalsozialismus: Rechtliche Ausgestaltung der Werbung und Tätigkeit des Werberats der deutschen Wirtschaft (= Rechtshistorische Reihe, Band 229). 2000 dissertation Universität Kiel 2000, Peter Lang, Frankfurt am Main 2000, ISBN 978-3-631-36875-6.
- Uwe Westphal: Werbung im Dritten Reich. Transit Buchverlag, Berlin, 1989, ISBN 3-88747-054-0.
- Wirtschaftswerbung. Mitteilungsblatt des Werberates der deutschen Wirtschaft. Berlin: Carl Heymanns Verlag, 1934–1944.
