= Yungbulakang Palace =

First Tibetan Palace in Yarlung Valley, Tibet, China

Yumbulagang Palace
- ཁྲ་འབྲུག་དགོན་པ
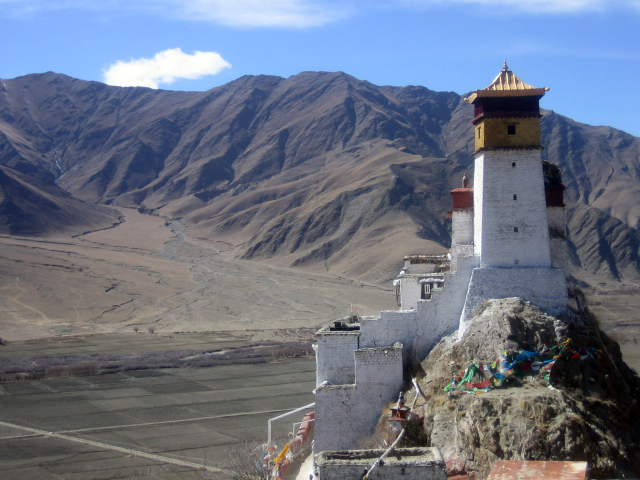
- The partially restored Yumbulagang

- Location within Tibet

Religion
- Affiliation: Bön, Vajrayana Buddhist, Tibetan Buddhist

Location
- Location: Lhoka, Ü-Tsang, Tibet
- Interactive map of Yumbulagang Palace
- Coordinates: 29.14258°N 91.80270°E

Architecture
- Style: Dzong architecture
- Founder: Nyatri Tsenpo
- Established: 127 BC; 2153 years ago
- Demolished: 1966

Yumbulagang (Tibetan: ཡུམ་བུ་བླ་སྒང།, Wylie: yum bu bla sgang) or Yumbu Lakhar (Tibetan: ཡུམ་བུ་བླ་མཁར།, Wylie: yum bu bla mkhar) is the original palace of the Yarlung kings of Tibet. In the Tibetan mythology, it was the first building in Tibet, and was the palace of the legendary first Tibetan king, Nyatri Tsenpo, who is said to have reigned from 127 BCE.

Yumbulagang stands on a hill at a bend along the Yarlung Tsampo River, on the eastern bank of the Yarlung Valley of southeast Lhokha, about 192 kilometres (119 mi) southeast of Lhasa and 9 kilometres (5.6 mi) south of Tsetang. The palace and its shrine were demolished during the 1966–1976 Cultural Revolution, and the palace has been partially rebuilt.

== History ==
Yumbulagang was built by the legendary first Tibetan king, Nyatri Tsenpo. He manifested by descending from the sky into a field of yaks, and was made the chief by the nomadic herds people. Chief Nyatri started to rule in 127 BCE, the start of the Tibetan Royal Era.

During the reign of the 28th king, Thothori Nyantsen in the fifth century AD, according to legend a golden stupa, a tsa-tsa mold, and a Mahayana sutra, that the king could not read, fell from the sky onto the roof of the Yumbulagang while the king was walking. Another account states that an Indian Buddhist monk brought the relics as gifts for the king, and told him to keep them safe for five generations when their meanings would be understood. Another later account suggests "a voice from the sky announced, 'In five generations one shall come that understands its meaning!' "

Five generations later, Yumbulagang became the palace of the 33rd Tibetan king, Songtsen Gampo (604–650 AD), who commissioned the written Tibetan language and alphabet. He introduced Mahayana Buddhism to his court, while two of his foreign wives were already Buddhists: The Nepali queen Bhrikuti and the Chinese queen Wencheng. After Songtsen Gampo built the Red Palace in Lhasa and transferred the seat of his temporal authority to Lhasa, Yumbulagang became a shrine.

During the reign of the 5th Dalai Lama (1617–1682) a thousand years later, the Dalai Lama rebuilt the Red Palace as the Potala Palace, and turned Yumbulagang into a monastery for the Gelug school.

The Yumbulagang was destroyed during the Cultural revolution and "only a piece of the original building's base remained in place." The palace was partially reconstructed in 1983.

Again in November 2017, restoration work valuing $1.5m began, to reinforce crumbling wooden foundations and cracked walls. It was reopen to the public in April 2018.

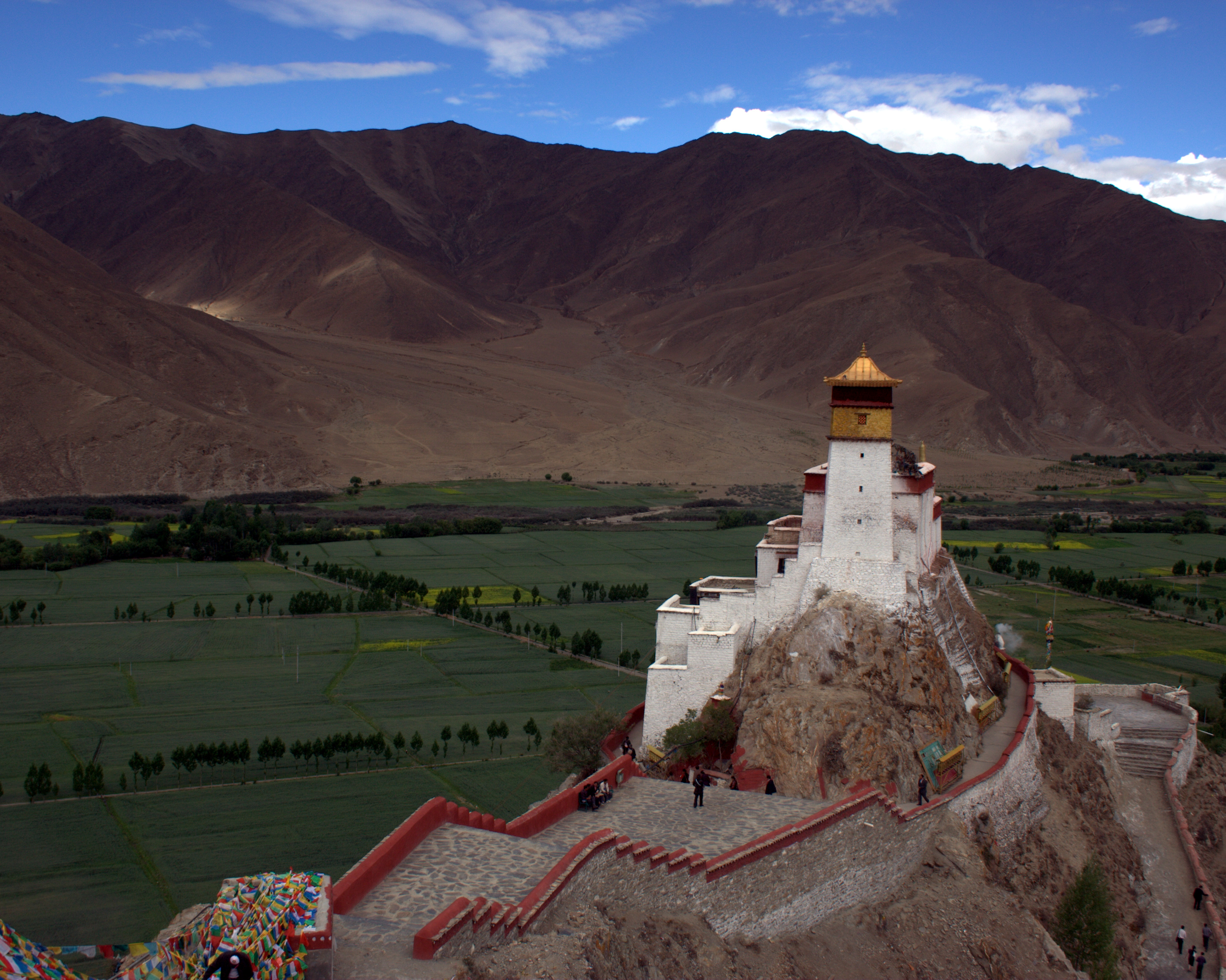

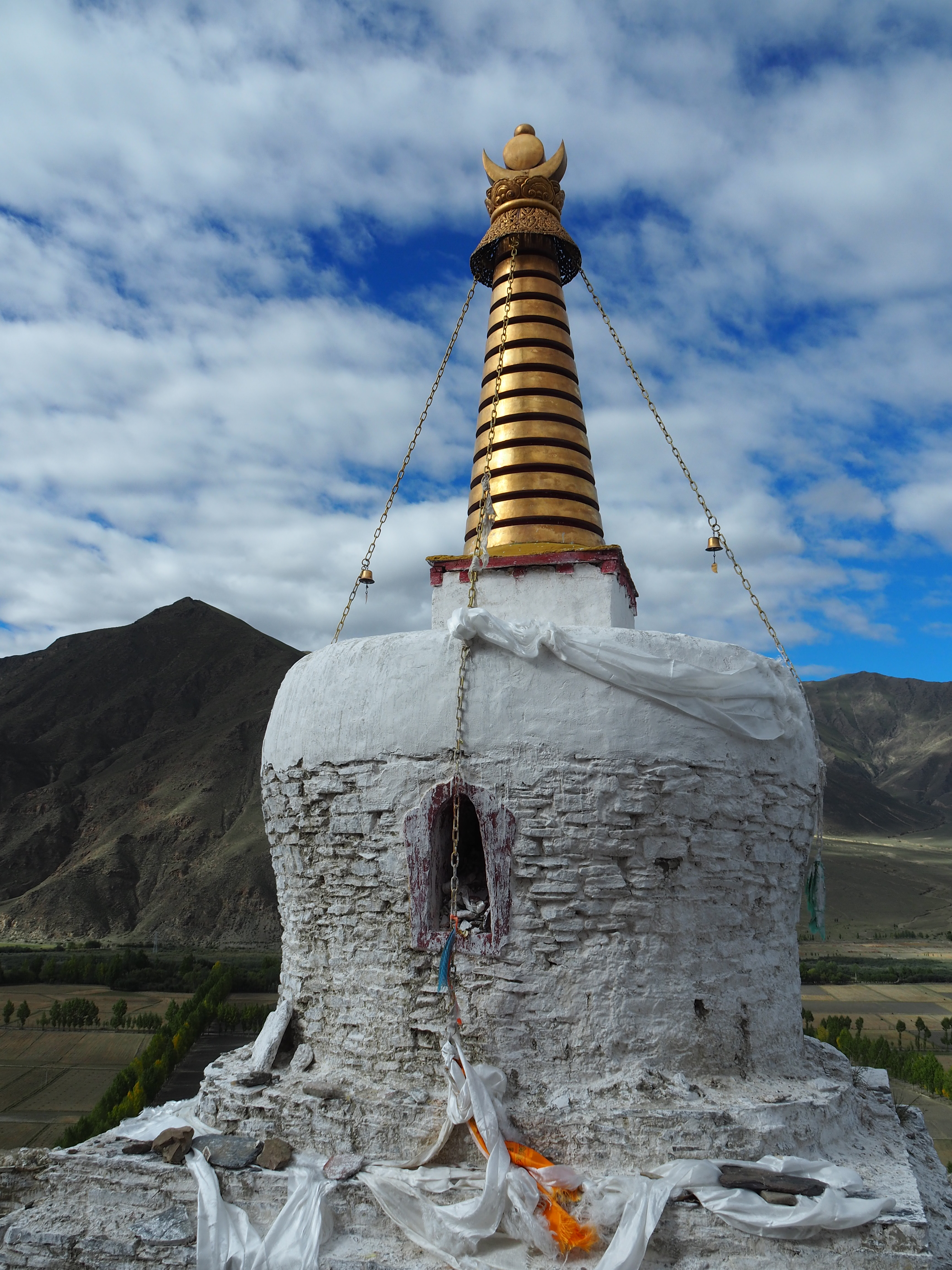
Stupa

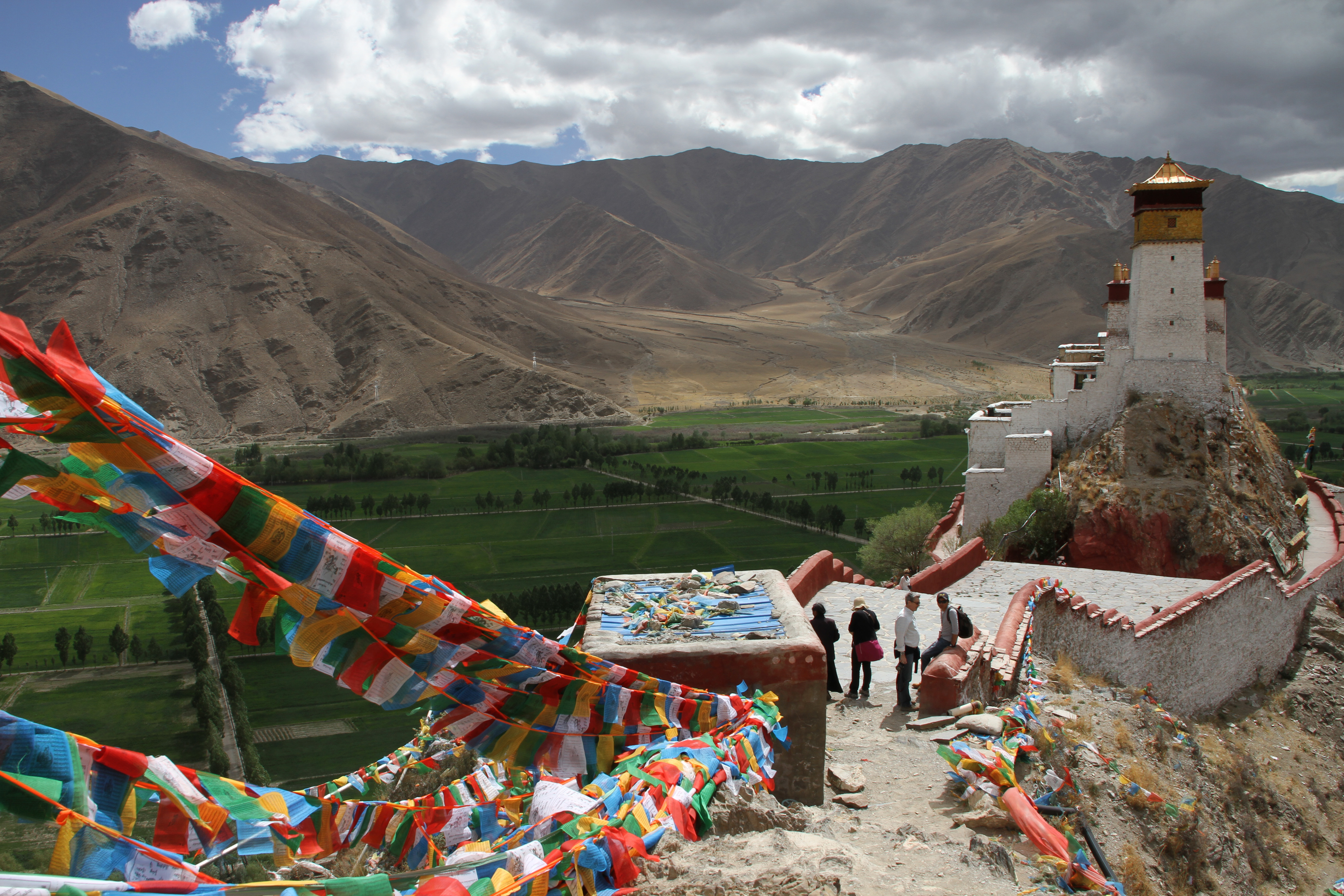

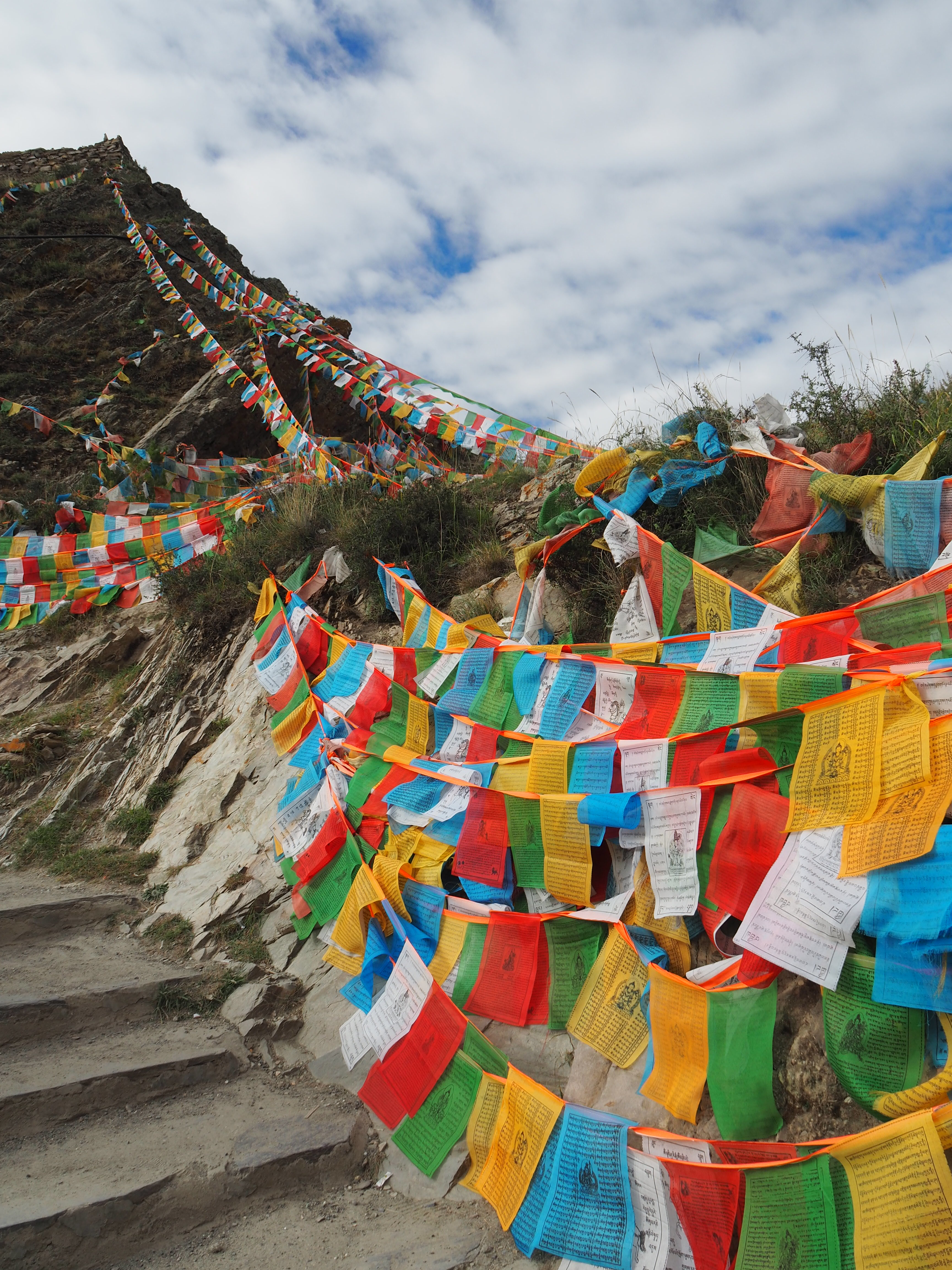
prayer flags on the path to Yumbulagang

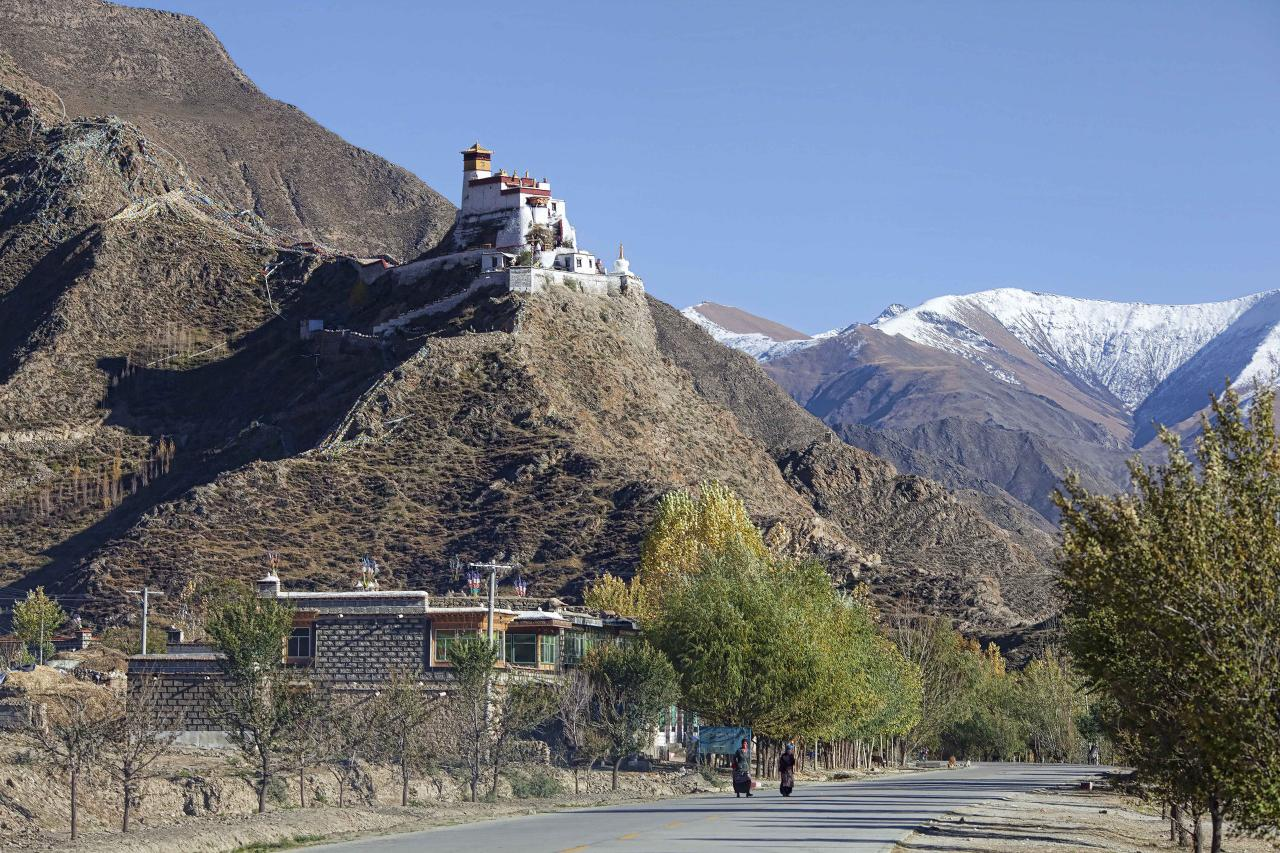

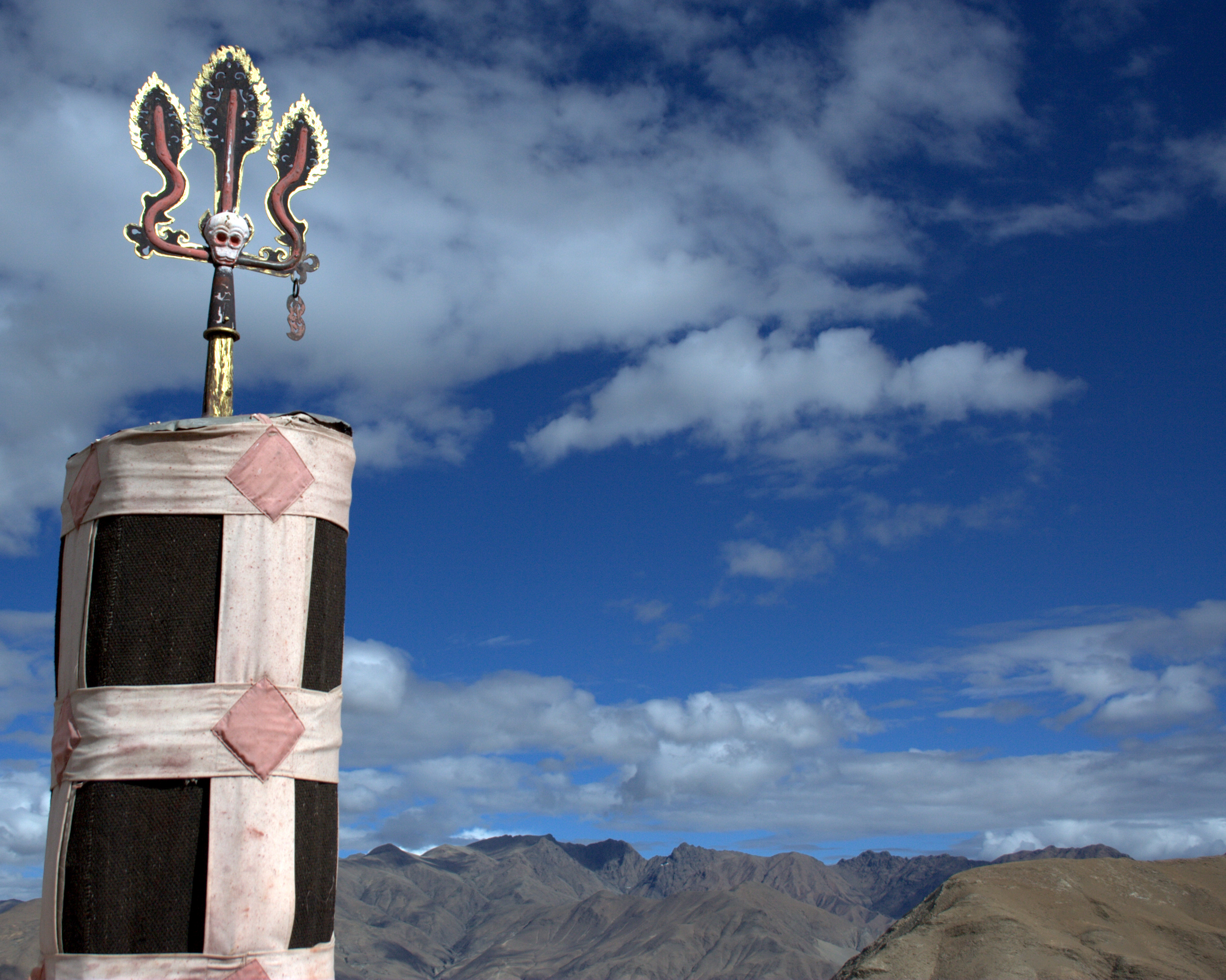
Pitchfork of Death at Yumbulagang

== Interior ==
The palace is divided into front and rear precincts. The front is a three-storey building while the rear is dominated by a tall tower, like a castle. Enshrined at the palace are the statues of Thiesung Sangjie Buddha, King Nyatri Tsenpo, the first King of Tibet, King Songtsen Gampo and other Tibetan Empire era kings.

== Zorthang ==
Traditionally, the largest cultivated area in Tibet, called Zorthang, is located to the northwest of Yumbulagang. Even today, farmers sprinkle soil from Zorthang on their own fields to ensure a good harvest. There used to be a temple, Lharu Menlha, containing images of the Eight Medicine Buddhas near the area.

Yumbulagang Palace

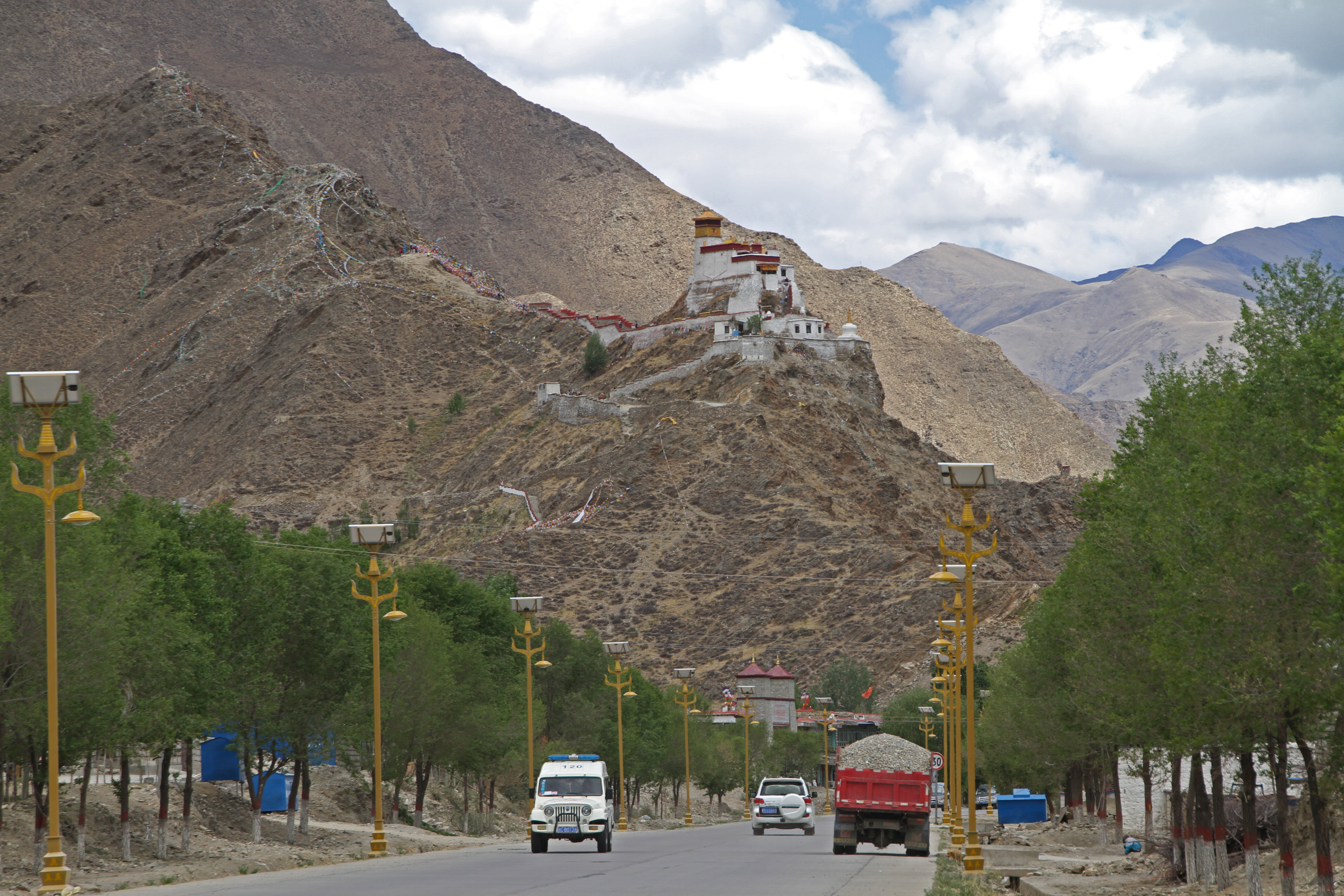

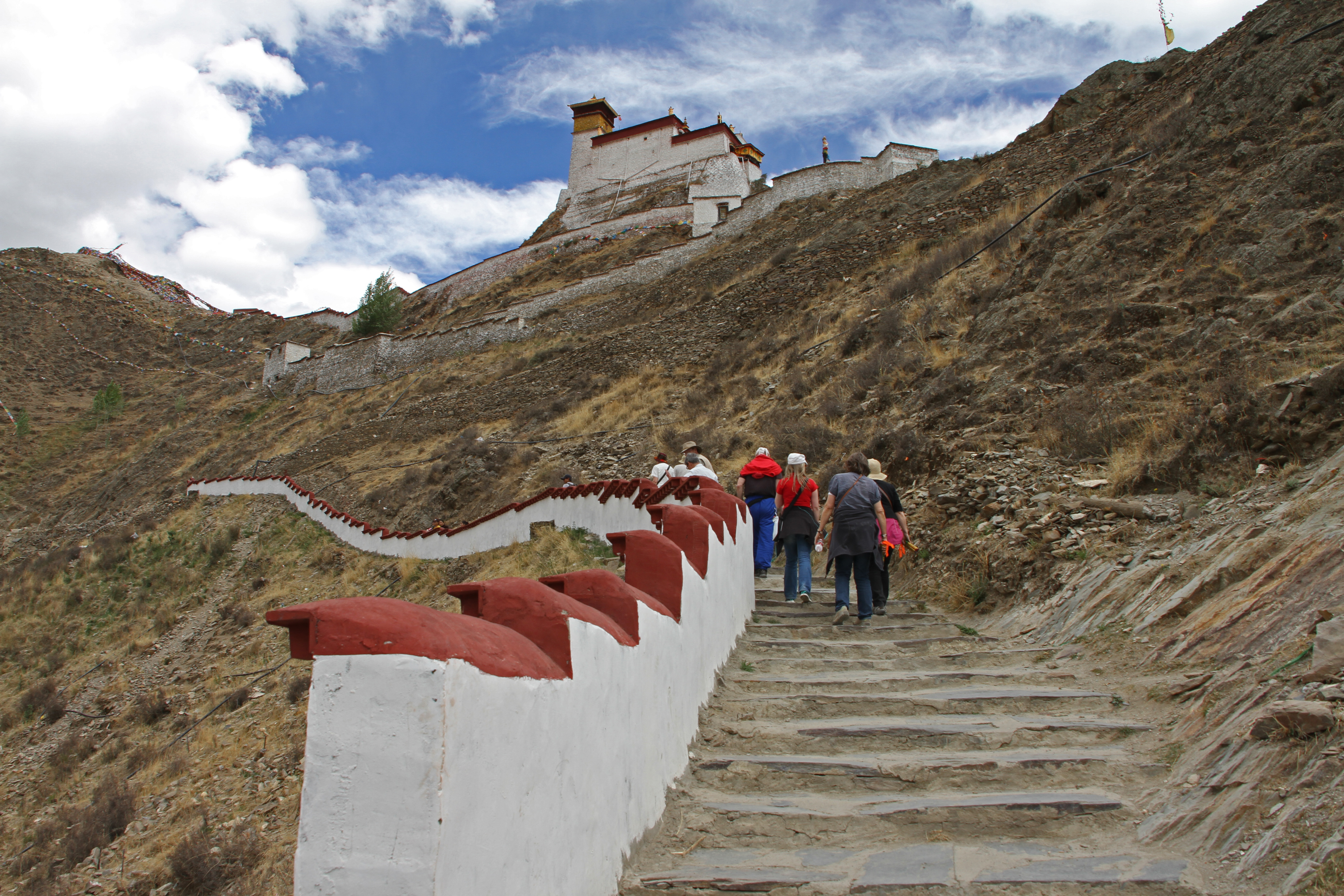

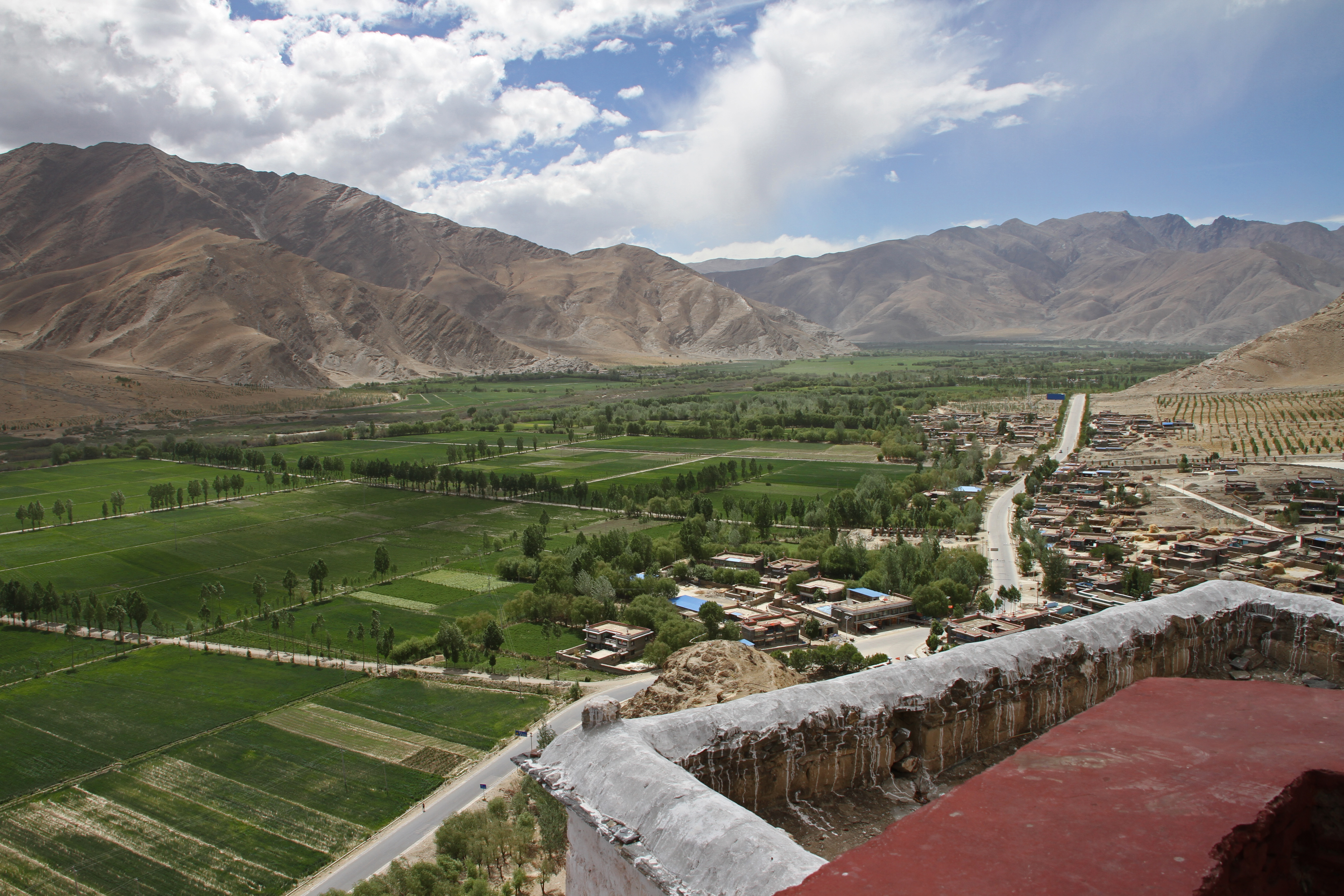

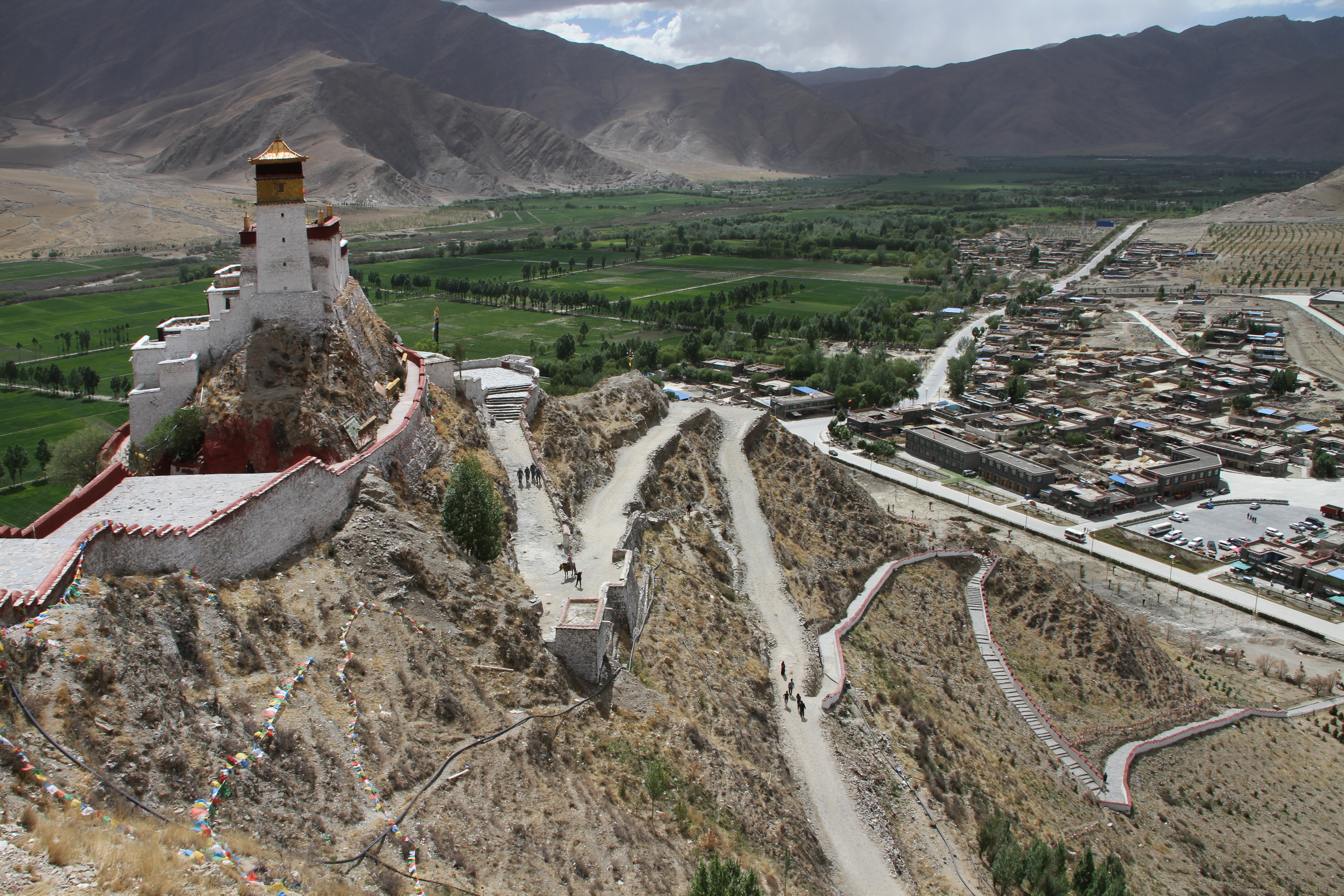

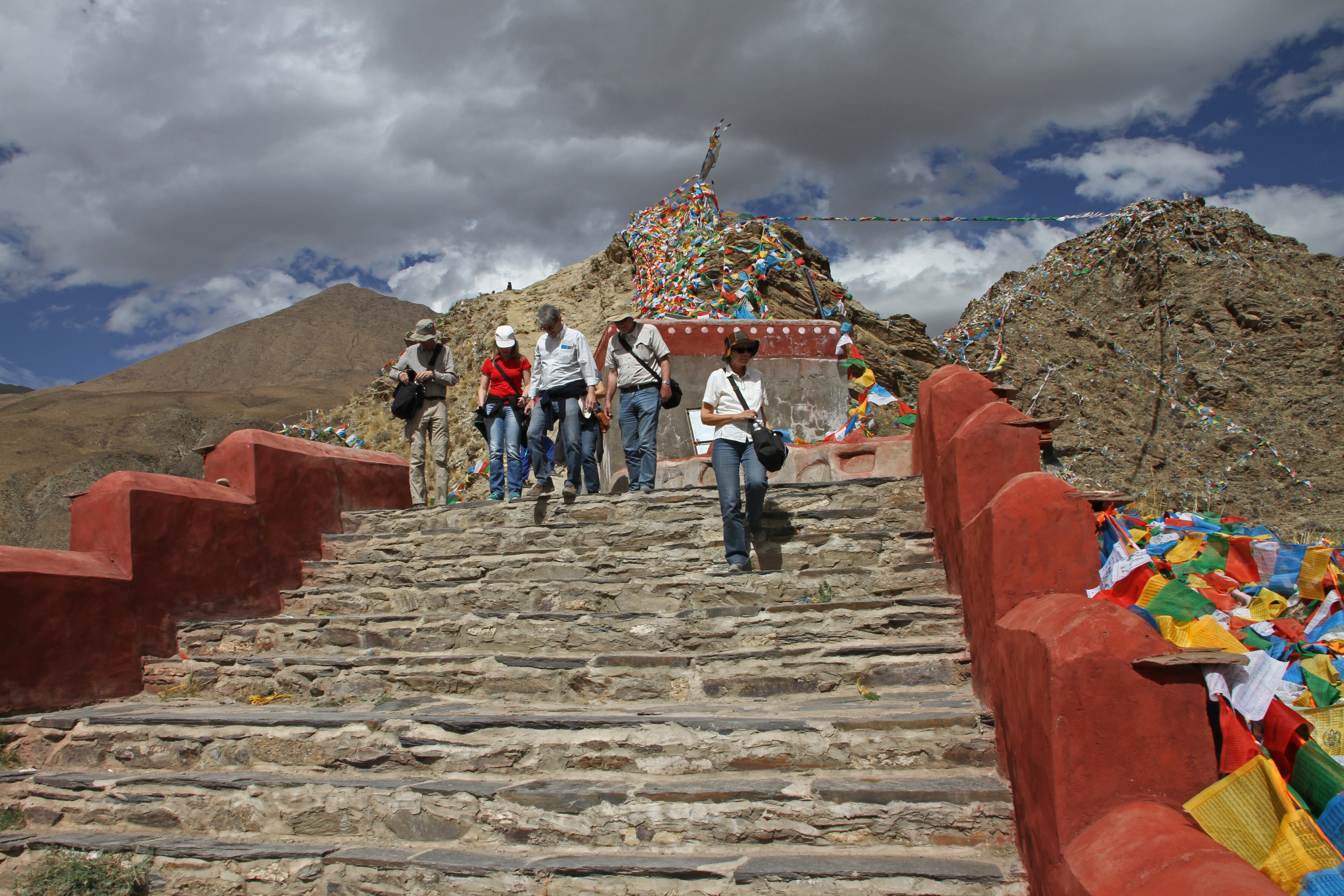
