= 1939 Japanese expedition to Tibet =

WWII-era intelligence mission by Nomoto Jinzo

Jinzō Nomoto

The Japanese expedition to Tibet was an intelligence mission undertaken by Jinzō Nomoto (野本 甚蔵, Nomoto Jinzō) in Tibet in 1939.

== Background ==
From 1918 to 1922, Japan began conducting secret operations in the Xinjiang area. Japanese Genyosha agents operated undercover in Hami and other cities to gain information about the Soviets in Central Asia.

During the 1930s, the Imperial Intelligence Services was interested in gaining in-depth intelligence about Tibet and Xinjiang. In the Kantogun headquarters, a series of undercover operations was organized, and Jinzō Nomoto was one of those to be sent on such missions. Germany also sent expeditions to the same areas in Xinjiang.

== Expedition ==
In 1935, Jinzō Nomoto, from Kagoshima, was sent to Manchukuo and was posted to an intelligence unit in the Japanese Kantogun Army as a Mongolian-language research student specializing in Central Asian issues.

In May 1939, during the Second Sino-Japanese War, Nomoto secretly entered Tibet by disguising himself as a Mongolian and accompanying a Tibetan monk. He began an 18-month intelligence-gathering mission that collected information regarding the social conditions, culture, religion, and local policies of the natives by personal interviews with local residents. He submitted the intelligence mainly to the Intelligence Army Bureau and left the area in October 1940.

The Muslim Chinese (Dungan) General Ma Bufang was an obstruction to Japanese agents trying to contact the Tibetans and was labeled as an "adversary" by a Japanese agent.

== Aftermath ==
Other agents continued secret moves in the area by meeting local Afghan tribesmen to organize infiltrations, sabotage, and disturbances in British India on the North West Frontier in case of a Japanese invasion of India. Another alleged interest in the Tibet area was the recovery of all information related to ancient powers related in Tibetan legends.

Jinzō Nomoto published his memoirs on his experiences in his Tibetan mission during the war in 2001 as Tibet Underground 1939(チベット潜行1939).

== See also ==
- 1938–1939 German expedition to Tibet
