= Brooke Dolan II =

American explorer

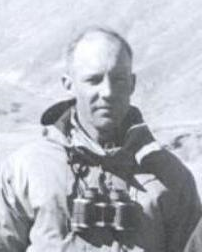
Brooke Dolan in 1942 near Lhasa before meeting with Tenzin Gyatso, the 14th Dalai Lama of Tibet

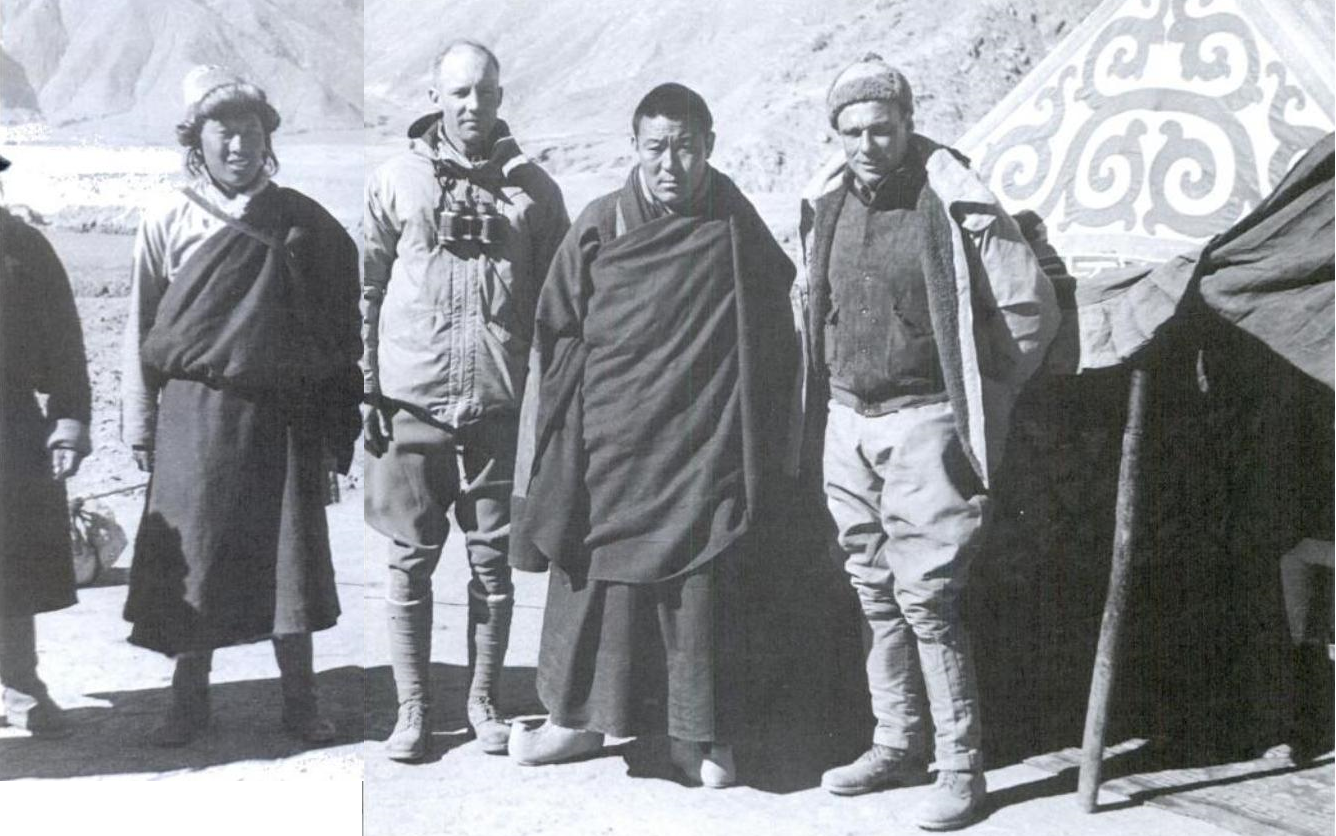
Brooke Dolan (second from left) and Ilya Tolstoy (right) with their monk-interpreter, Kusho Yonton Singhe, standing in front of a traditional Tibetan tent set up outside Lhasa for the expedition's official greeting ceremony

Brooke Dolan II (October 12, 1908 – Chongqing, China, August 19 or 29, 1945) was an American adventurer, intelligence officer, and naturalist in the 1930s and 1940s. His father was a wealthy American industrialist in Philadelphia. During World War II, he served as a lieutenant and captain. He travelled three times to Tibet, first in 1931 and the second in 1934, collecting a large number of bird and mammal specimens for the Philadelphia Academy of Natural Sciences. As a member of the Office of Strategic Services, he was sent to Lhasa in 1942 along with Ilya Tolstoy to examine supply routes for the Allies in China and were the first Americans to meet the 14th Dalai Lama, then aged seven.

== Biography ==
Brooke Dolan II was born on October 12, 1908, the son of Thomas Jefferson Dolan and Isabella Whelen née Hoffman. He was educated at Princeton University and Harvard University. He was a trustee of the Academy of Natural Sciences in Philadelphia. He led two expeditions to China and eastern Tibet in 1931 to 1932 and 1934 to 1936. The first expedition comprised Ernst Schäfer, a German zoologist, Gordon Bowles, Otto Gneiser, and Hugo Weigold. The second comprised Schäfer and Marion Duncan, an American missionary. Dolan's second expedition may have been motivated partly by the need to take a leave of absence from Philadelphia society after a January 1934 arrest on disorderly conduct charges.

On April 15, 1934, Dolan married Emilie Campan Gerhard, daughter of Albert Pepper Gerhard, of Overbrook, Philadelphia who accompanied him for a while on his second trip to China.

Dolan joined the United States Army Air Forces after the attack on Pearl Harbor. In 1942 he traveled to Lhasa with Ilia Tolstoy, a grandson of Leo Tolstoy, as a member of the Office of Strategic Services (OSS), to meet with the Tibetan government. On December 20, 1942, they met the young 14th Dalai Lama and his Regent, the 3rd Taktra Rinpoche. They were the first Americans ever to meet a Dalai Lama. Tolstoy and Dolan, who were nicknamed "Mud" and "Slug" by their fellow OSS officers, both received the Legion of Merit for the mission. They are considered to have gone beyond their authority in leading the Tibetan government to believe the United States had given international political recognition to Tibet. Photographs taken by Dolan and Tolstoy on their expedition were published in A Portrait of Lost Tibet by Rosemary Jones Tung.

After the Tibetan expedition Dolan transferred from the OSS to the Army Air Forces and joined the United States Military Observer Group in Yunnan, China. Dolan died in Chongqing, China. According to some accounts, he was killed on an OSS mission to rescue downed Allied bomber crews; according to other accounts, he took his own life on August 19, 1945.
