= Yarlung Tsangpo Shuizangtai =

Water burial site in Shannan, Tibet

- ཡར་ཀླུངས་གཙང་པོ་ཆུ་འཇོག་ས།
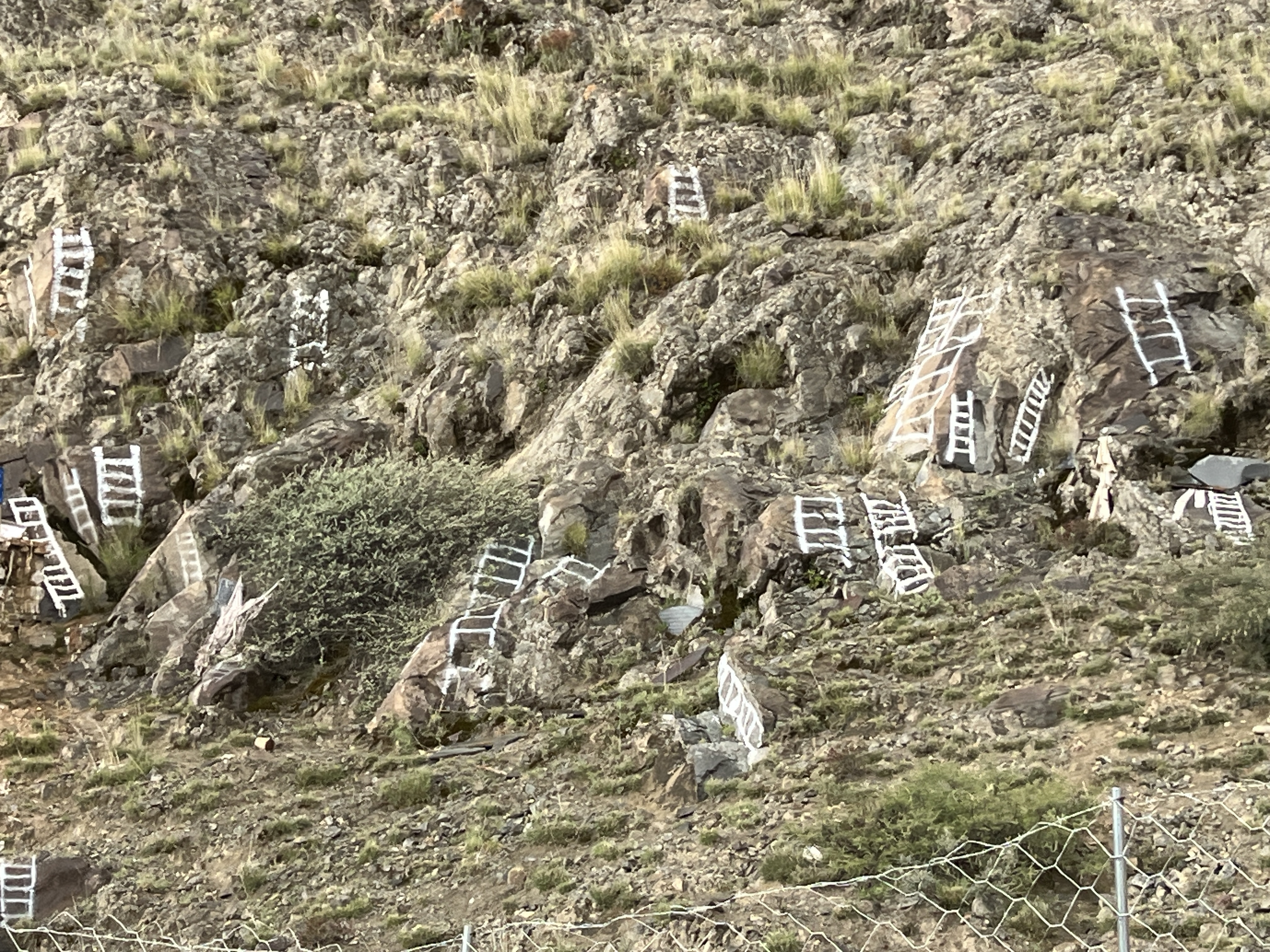
- Heavenly ladder murals on the mountainside

Details
- Established: Unknown
- Location: Gonggar County, Shannan, Tibet
- Country: China
- Type: Water burial site

Yarlung Tsangpo Shuizangtai or Yarlung Tsangpo River Water Burial Platform is a water burial site in Shannan, Tibet that is still in use.

The mountainside features numerous ladder murals, possibly representing heavenly ladders praying for the deceased to be reborn in the Pure Land. Those who died young were often given water burials, and it’s said that the number of rungs on the ladder corresponded to the age of the deceased. The platform is located at the confluence of the Yarlung Tsangpo River and the Lhasa River, adjacent to National Highway 349, near the Qushui Yarlung Tsangpo River Bridge.
