= Gonggar Xoi =

Xoi
- Location within Tibet
- Coordinates: 29°21′N 90°39′E
- Country: China
- Region: Tibet

Population
  - Total
  - Major Nationalities: Tibetan
  - Regional dialect: Tibetan language
- Time zone: +8

Gonggar Xoi, locally just Xoi, is a village in Gangdoi, Gangdoi Town, Gonggar County, Tibet Autonomous Region, China. It was the capital of Gonggar County and the seat of Gonggar Dzong from 17th century to 1960. Gonggar Xoi means below the Gonggar (dzong).

== See also ==
- List of towns and villages in Tibet
