= List of highways numbered 347 =

The following highways are numbered 347:

== Australia ==
- Heathcote-Rochester Road

== Canada ==
- Manitoba Provincial Road 347
- Nova Scotia Route 347
- Prince Edward Island Route 347
- Quebec Route 347

== India ==
- National Highway 347

== Japan ==
- Japan National Route 347

== United Kingdom ==
- A347 road, Ferndown to Bournemouth, Dorset

== United States ==
- Arizona State Route 347
- Arkansas Highway 347
- Colorado State Highway 347
- County Road 347 (Levy County, Florida)
- Georgia State Route 347
- Maryland Route 347
- Mississippi Highway 347
- New Jersey Route 347
- New Mexico State Road 347
- New York:
  - New York State Route 347 (disambiguation)
  - County Route 347 (Erie County, New York)
- Ohio State Route 347
- Pennsylvania Route 347
- Puerto Rico Highway 347
- Tennessee State Route 347
- Texas State Highway 347
- Virginia State Route 347

Preceded by 346	Lists of highways 347	Succeeded by 348
