= Gongkar Chö Monastery =

Tibetan Buddhist monastery in Gonggar County, Tibet, China

Gongkar Chö Monastery Gonkar Dorjé Monastery
- Location within Tibet Autonomous Region

Religion
- Affiliation: Tibetan Buddhism
- Sect: Zung branch
- Leadership: Gongkar Dorje Dhenpa Rinpoche

Location
- Location: Gonggar County, Lhoka Prefecture, Tibet Autonomous Region
- Country: Tibet Autonomous Region, China
- Interactive map of Gongkar Chö Monastery; Gonkar Dorjé Monastery
- Coordinates: 29°17′52″N 90°59′4″E

Architecture
- Style: Tibetan
- Founder: Dorje Chang Kunga Namgyal (1432–1496).
- Established: 1464; 562 years ago

The Gongkar Chö Monastery or Gongkar Dorjé Monastery (Wylie: gong dkar chos sde, gong dkar rdo rje gdan) is located in Gonggar County, Lhoka Province, Tibet Autonomous Region near Gonggar Dzong and Lhasa Gonggar Airport.

== History ==
The monastery, which was built in 1464, belongs to the Zung branch of the Sakya school of Tibetan Buddhism. It is 400 metres (1,300 ft) south of the Lhasa road. The principal founder of the Dzongpa Tradition was Dorje Chang Kunga Namgyal (1432–1496). The main monastery of the Dzongpa is Gongkar Chode just south-west of Lhasa on the south side of the Tsangpo River.

In the 16th century, the monastery was beautified with wall paintings of the Khyenri school of Tibetan paintings done by the well-known artist of the times, Jamyang Khyentse Wangchuk (b.1524).

The book, Tibet Overland says, "... the murals on the ground floor were whitewashed during the Cultural Revolution in the 1960s. They were subsequently restored in the 1980s."

== Geography ==
The Gongkar Dorjden or the Gongkar Monastery is located on a hill top cliff in the Gongkar valley on the southern side of the Tsangpo River, on the Lhasa Gonggar Airport road to the south of the main road, 75 kilometres (47 mi) from Lhasa.

== History ==
The history of the monastery is traced to the first visit of Jowo-je Palden Atisha, (980–1054 CE), Buddhist teacher from the Pala Empire in Indian subcontinent. During his first visit, Atisha had stopped close to the location of the monastery, prostrated in the direction of the monastery and prophesied that one day a monastery would be built at this location, which would become famous. He had marked the location with a mound of white pebbles in the form of a Mandala (this mound got destroyed during the Cultural Revolution). The Dzong was under the stewardship of Dorje-denpa Kun-ga Namgyal also known as Dorje Chang Kunga Namgyal (1432–1496), who was a well-known Guru who had received training in the Sutra, Tantra and Tantric rituals from masters of all Buddhist traditions. He was the holder of the Dzongpa tradition of the Sakyapa school of Tibetan Buddhism. When he was sitting on the roof of his house in the Gongkar Dzong, while reciting the religious scripture, the Vajradhatu, a leaf of the scripture was flown away by wind, and it fell at a location where the present Gongkar Choede Monastery is located.

It is mentioned that between Gongkar and Tsetang there are seven gompas of the Sakyapa sect, including the Gongkar Dorjeden, the pillar of Sakyapa power, to the south of the Tsongpo valley. These monasteries survived destruction during the Cultural Revolution, mainly because they were converted into grain storage silos (to keep grains dry) and offices of the Chinese army. This was a kind of blessing in disguise as the rare paintings and other art objects only suffered minor problems of soot cover which could be later retrieved by art restorers.

The Gongkar Monastery also became famous because it was here that the artistic Central Tibetan painting of Kyenri originated.

== Structure ==
The monastery, situated on the southern side of the Tsangpo River, has in its precincts the main shrine as well as the Shedra, the monastic college. It is a three-storied structure which houses the dukhang, lhakhangs, the Rinpoche's living quarters and the kitchen with a “perfect arrangement of hermitages and colleges.” The main shrine has an assembly hall, which is a 64-pillared hall, where the new statues of Sakya Pandita, Sakyamuni Buddha, Guru Padmasambhava, Drolma and Dorje Denpa, the founder of the monastery are deified. The Gongkhang, on the left of the main hall, depicts wall paintings in black colour, on its outer chambers, of the practice of the Sky Burial prevalent in Tibet. There is also gilt on black painted mural of Mahakala represented as Pranjaranatha (Gonpo Gur), the Sakyapa Protector, in the inner hall of the main shrine and also a few spectacular spirit traps. The inner sanctum of the monastery has frescos of the Sakyapa founders, painted in Kyenri-style of art and an inner kora (nang-khor). The paintings have been influenced by traditional Chinese art. The chapel is located to the right of the Assembly Hall and has statues of the Past, Present and Future Buddhas. One floor above the main hall, paintings of the original monastery layout can be seen. The monastery shrine is flanked by the Khyedor Lhakhang and the Kangyur Lhakhang; the Khyedor Lhakhang has frescos of Hevajra, and Yab-Yum (tantric depiction of the sexual union).

Along the circumambulatory path around the inner sanctum, original frescos of the 12 Deeds of the Shakyamuni and Thousand Buddhas of the Aeons are seen. However, a three-story-high image of Buddha with the skull of the Indian master Gayadhara, which once existed here in the inner sanctum, is not seen now.

While circumambulating the monastery in a clockwise direction, the Shedra or the monastic college is seen to the left in the northern direction of the complex. The monastic college holds painting classes in the morning session and debating classes in the afternoon, for the monks.

Other religious building close to the monastery is the Dechen Chakor Monastery, about 3 kilometres (1.9 mi) away on a side valley, and 13 kilometres (8.1 mi) away is the Gonggar Dzong.

The monastery was ransacked by red guards during the Cultural Revolution; the main hall was used as a barley silo and murals were defaced with Mao Zedong slogans. Despite the destruction, the surviving mural work at the monastery is aesthetically done.

The monastery used to house one hundred and sixty monks, but now has only thirty monks. The main building is in a good condition, and the exterior has been restored.

== Festivals ==
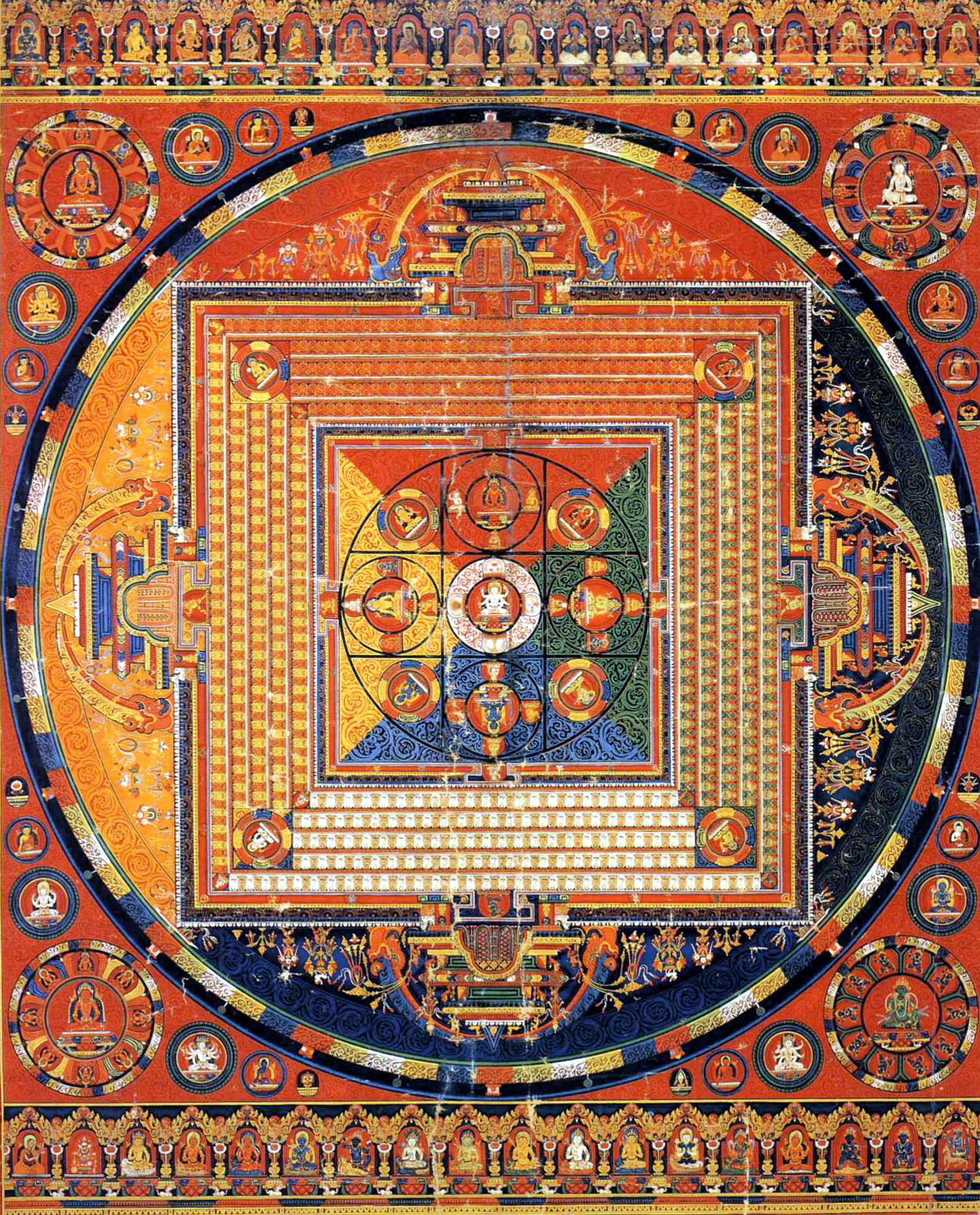
A Mandala drawn during ritualistic Buddhist festivals

The monastic community (there were 260 lamas in the past, now only 30) perform an annual festival of Mandala rituals from the 6th to the 15th day of the first lunar month, according to the Tibetan calendar. Over a two-day period, 28 sand Mandalas are created according to the Carya, Yoga and Anuttarayoga Tantras. These are the concise deity cycles according to the Vajrapanjara namely, “the Hevajra tantra, black Hevajra, Hevajra in Dombhi Heruka's tradition, Hevajra in the Tsokye Dorje tradition, Hevajra in the oral instruction tradition, the fifteen goddess cycle of Nairatma, Samvara in Mahasiddha Luipa's tradition, Samvara in Krsnapada's tradition, the five-deity Samvara of Ghantapada, the 37 Varahi form of Samvara, Guhyasamaj-aksobhyavajra, the thirteen deity Bhairava, 49 deity Bhairava, the Vetalaraja form of Bhairava, black Yama, five deity red Yama, thirteen deity red Yama, six faced Yama, Mahamaya, five deity Manjusri, (Rigs gsum rig gtad), (gZa' yum skar yum), nine deity Amitayus, Vidharana in Virupa's tradition, Sarvavid vairocana, Panjara-tara and Vajra-tara”.

On the first day of the ritual, 45 dancers perform a dance known as the 'sun disk' and prepare the ground for depicting the Mandalas. The second day is devoted to preparing the Mandalas. The following seven days, 60 odd dancers perform a hundredfold offering services every day, and a thousandfold offering on the 15th day of the month (full moon) day. The large scroll painting of Shakyamuni is unveiled when white silk scarves are offered by devotees to it. Several types of ritualistic dances are performed by the devotees. Much fanfare follows in the form of golden procession, similar to the one held in Lhasa, with offering ceremonies, comprising banners, canopies, streamers, blowing of horns, offering of incense, variety of auspicious symbols and materials, the seven emblems of royalty, the eight auspicious symbols, and the eight substances. In the main assembly hall, "May I become the protector of all sentient beings without exception ..." is chanted. In the afternoon, fire rituals based on the Hevajra tantra are performed, which includes the fire dance by a retinue of the eight goddesses of Hevajra. In the evening, offerings are made to the protectors, followed by a three-day re-consecration ceremony.
