= List of highways numbered 345 =

The following highways are numbered 345:

== Australia ==
- Victoria

== Canada ==
- Manitoba Provincial Road 345
- New Brunswick Route 345
- Newfoundland and Labrador Route 345
- Prince Edward Island Route 345
- Quebec Route 345

== Japan ==
- Japan National Route 345

== Nigeria ==
- A345 highway (Nigeria)

== United Kingdom ==
- A345 road, Marlborough, Wiltshire to Salisbury, Wiltshire

== United States ==
- Interstate 345 (unsigned)
- Arkansas Highway 345
- Florida:
  - Florida State Road 345
  - County Road 345 (Levy County, Florida)
- New York State Route 345
- North Carolina Highway 345
- Ohio State Route 345
- Pennsylvania Route 345
- Puerto Rico Highway 345
- Texas:
  - Texas State Highway 345
  - Texas State Highway Loop 345
- Virginia State Route 345
  - Virginia State Route 345 (former)
- Wyoming Highway 345

Preceded by 344	Lists of highways 345	Succeeded by 346
