= List of highways numbered 344 =

The following highways are numbered 344:

== Australia ==
- Heathcote-Nagambie Road

== Canada ==
- Manitoba Provincial Road 344
- Newfoundland and Labrador Route 344
- Nova Scotia Route 344
- Quebec Route 344
- Route 344 (Prince Edward Island)

== India ==
- National Highway 344 (India)

== Japan ==
- Japan National Route 344

== Nigeria ==
- A344 highway (Nigeria)

== United Kingdom ==
- A344 road (England), former road in Wiltshire.

== United States ==
- County Road 344 (Gilchrist County, Florida)
- Arkansas Highway 344
  - Arkansas Highway 344 (1973–1978)
- Georgia State Route 344 (former)
- Kentucky Route 344
- Maryland Route 344
- New York State Route 344
- North Carolina Highway 344
- Ohio State Route 344
- Oklahoma State Highway 344
- South Carolina Highway 344
- Tennessee State Route 344
- Texas:
  - Texas State Highway 344 (former)
  - Texas State Highway Loop 344
  - Farm to Market Road 344
- Virginia State Route 344

Territories

- Puerto Rico Highway 344

Preceded by 343	Lists of highways 344	Succeeded by 345
