= List of highways numbered 348 =

The following highways are numbered 348:

== Brazil ==
- SP-348: Rodovia dos Bandeirantes

== Canada ==
- Manitoba Provincial Road 348
- Nova Scotia Route 348
- Prince Edward Island Route 348
- Quebec Route 348

== India ==
- National Highway 348 (India)

== Japan ==
- Japan National Route 348

== United Kingdom ==
- A348 road, Trickett's Cross to Poole, Dorset

== United States ==
- Arkansas Highway 348
- Colorado State Highway 348
- Georgia State Route 348
- Kentucky Route 348
- Louisiana Highway 348
- Maryland Route 348
- New York:
  - New York State Route 348 (former)
  - County Route 348 (Erie County, New York)
- Ohio State Route 348
- Pennsylvania Route 348
- Puerto Rico Highway 348
- Tennessee State Route 348
- Texas:
  - Texas State Highway 348 (former)
  - Texas State Highway Spur 348
- Virginia State Route 348

Preceded by 347	Lists of highways 348	Succeeded by 349
