= Okowa =

Japanese steamed rice dish

Okowa おこわ (御強)
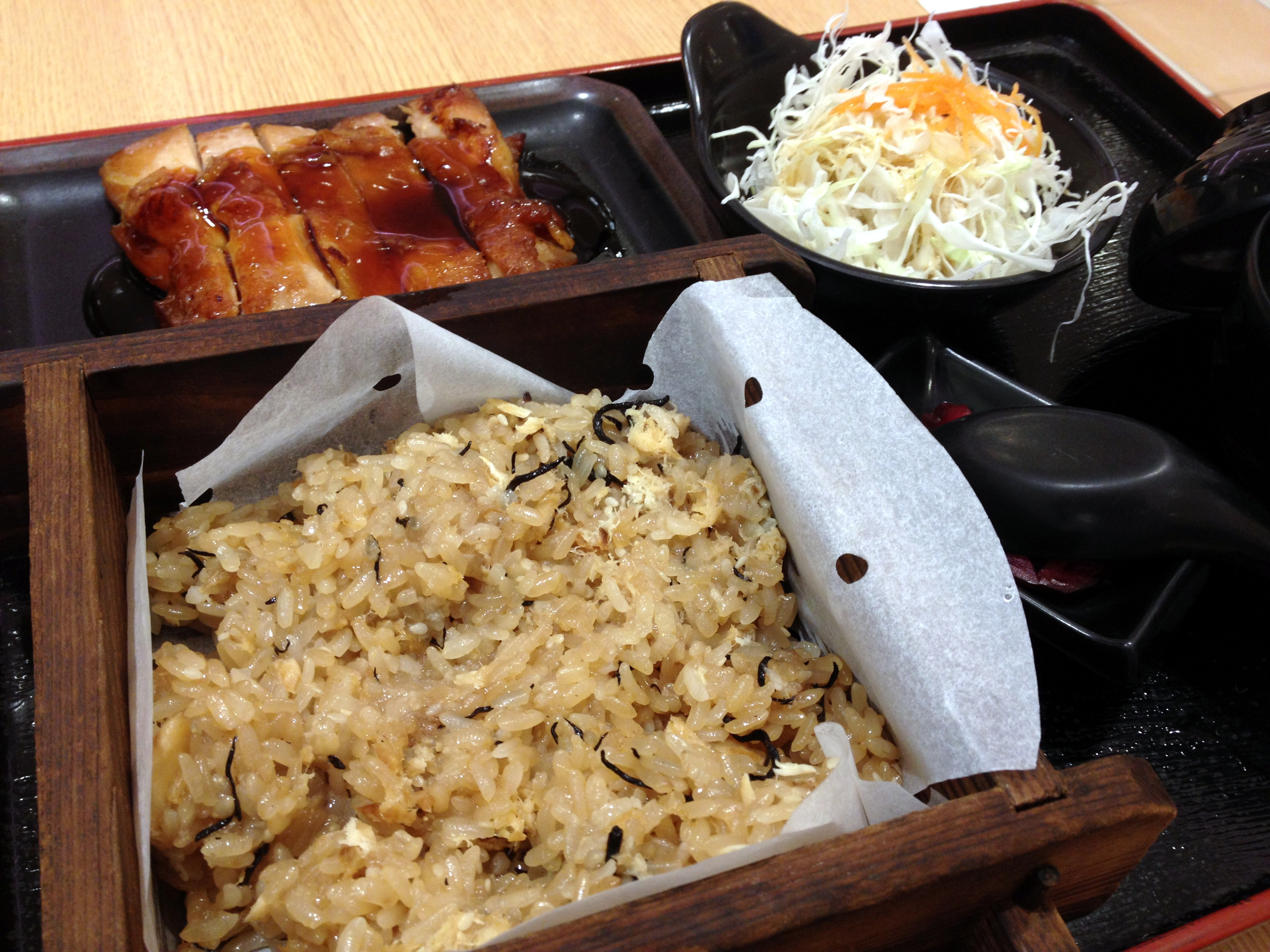
- Okowa bento
- Alternative names: おこわ (御強)
- Type: steamed rice dish
- Place of origin: Japan
- Associated cuisine: Japanese
- Serving temperature: Room temperature
- Main ingredients: rice, meat or vegetables
- Ingredients generally used: wild herbs (sansai okowa) and vessel chestnuts (kuri okowa)
- Variations: Sekihan or Kowameshi

Okowa おこわ (御強) is a Japanese steamed rice dish made with glutinous rice mixed with meat or vegetables. It is sometimes combined with wild herbs (sansai okowa) and vessel chestnuts (kuri okowa). It is generally boiled glutinous rice blended with azuki beans to give it red color for festive look, made by boiling regular rice with azuki beans. Since okowa is meant to be eaten at room temperature, it is used to make onigiri for its capacity to be frozen well.

== Etymology ==
The word Okowa in Japanese stems from a shortened form of Kowameshi (強飯, meaning "hard rice"). Sometimes, dishes made by blending different rice varieties is also known as Okowa.

== History ==
Originally referred to plain glutinous rice made in steam, Okowa today refers to red rice called Sekihan. White steamed rice is called by another name.

== Variations ==
Okowa can be mixed with any kind of meat or vegetable. Some traditional accompaniments include sweet potato, pre-cooked chestnuts, and boiled bamboo shoots. Char siu pork, roasted duck or diced sausage are also common additions.

== Preparation ==
The ingredients used for making okowa rice balls include glutinous rice (short-grain), sesame oil, dashi, soy sauce, mirin, salt, ginger, chopped mushrooms and carrots, sweet potato, chestnuts, spring onions, cooked fish, and a sheet of nori. The rice is washed with water and is left to be drained for around thirty minutes. Rice is added along with the stock, mirin, sesame oil, salt, sake in a rice cooker, and it is left for another thirty minutes. Meat, vegetables, and ginger are added next, and the cooker is put to the short-grain rice setting. The lid is covered while using the saucepan and brought to the boil once before turning the flame to low for another twelve minutes. The flame is turned off, and the rice is steamed another for ten minutes. The rice is kept in the room temperature and shaped into small triangles or balls. Finally, the base of rice balls is wrapped with nori sheet.

== See also ==
- Xôi
