= List of highways numbered 346 =

The following highways are numbered 346:

== Australia ==
Avenel-Nagambie Road

== Canada ==
- Manitoba Provincial Road 346
- Newfoundland and Labrador Route 346
- Quebec Route 346

== Japan ==
- Japan National Route 346

== United States ==
- Georgia State Route 346 (former)
- Iowa Highway 346
- Kentucky Route 346
- Louisiana Highway 346
- Maryland Route 346
- New York:
  - New York State Route 346
  - County Route 346 (Erie County, New York)
  - County Route 346 (Wayne County, New York)
- Pennsylvania Route 346
- Puerto Rico Highway 346
- South Carolina Highway 346
- Tennessee State Route 346
- Texas:
  - Texas State Highway 346 (former)
  - Farm to Market Road 346
- Vermont Route 346
- Virginia State Route 346

Preceded by 345	Lists of highways 346	Succeeded by 347
