= Chênggo =

Township in Gonggar County, Tibet

Coordinates: 29°22′N 91°10′E

Chênggo (Tibetan: འཕྲེང་གོ་, Wylie: phreng go; Chinese: 昌果; pinyin: Chāngguǒ) is a township in Gonggar County, Tibet Autonomous Region of China. It lies at an altitude of 4,744 metres (15,567 feet).

== See also ==
- List of towns and villages in Tibet
