= Gonggar Dzong =

Gonggar Zong Gongkar Dzong
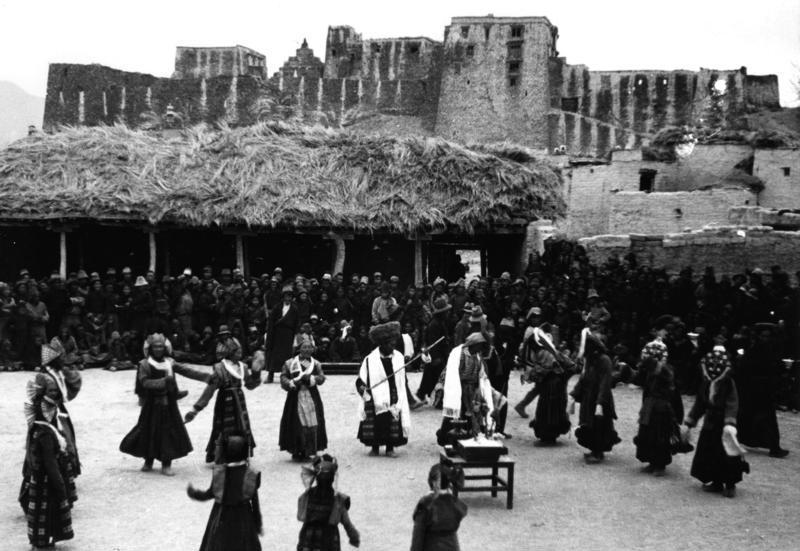
- Gonggar Zong

- Location within Tibet Autonomous Region

Religion
- Affiliation: Tibetan Buddhism
- Sect: Sakyapa

Location
- Location: Gonggar County, Shannan Prefecture, Tibet Autonomous Region, China
- Coordinates: 29.275556°N 90.789722°E

Architecture
- Style: Dzong

The Gonggar Dzong (Tibetan: གོང་དཀར་ཛོང༌།, Wylie: gong-dkar rdzong, ZWPY: Konggar Zong, Chinese: 贡嘎旧宗府), also known as Gongkar Dzong, is located in Gonggar County, Shannan Prefecture, Tibet, China. It is close to the Gongkar town, the Gonggar Choide Monastery and the Gonggar Airport, 10 kilometres (6.2 mi) from the town. The Dzong is also known by names such as Kung-k'o, Chi-hsiung, K'ung-ka-tsung, Konka Dzong, K'ung-ka-tsung, Gongkar, Kung-k'o, Kung-ka, Gongkar Dzong, Kong-ka-dsong, Kongka Dzong and Gonggar.

The Dzong, which was built on the pattern of the Potala Palace in Lhasa, is mostly in ruins. It is on the road to Chusul, near to Sundruling Monastery.

== Geography ==
The fortress of Gonggar Dzong (gong dkar rdzong) is near the confluence of the Tsangpo and Kyichu Rivers. Located at an elevation of 13,372 feet (4,076 m), the Dzong is known by several names such as Kung-k'o, Chi-hsiung, K'ung-ka-tsung, Konka Dzong, K'ung-ka-tsung, Gongkar, Kung-k'o, Kung-ka, Gongkar Dzong, Kong-ka-dsong, Kongka Dzong and Gonggar.

The Gongkar Dzong on the Gyido Xoi (skyid do shod) hill has settlement at the foothill where there is a tall prayer flag pole in the foreground. There are a large number of buildings in the settlement.

From the Gampa La pass (4,794 metres (15,728 ft)), the road leads to the Yamdrok Yumtso Lake (the spiritual or divine lake) and descends to the Chushul Zamchen bridge. The Dzong is approached from the southern end of this bridge. The Dzong is26 kilometres (16 mi) away from the bridge. Located on the hilltop, it provides panoramic view of the Gongkar region.

== History ==
The headquarters of the governor of Gongkar (or Gonggar) was at Gonggar Dzong. The Dzongpon (Administrator operating from this Dzong) had control over the agricultural land that stretched on the south bank of the Tsongpo River from Chowo Ri to Rawame.

The current Gonggar Dzong at Xoi, Gangdoi, Gangdoi Town was the capital of Gonggar from 17th century to 1960 until it was moved to Gyixung in 1962. There was an even older Gonggar Dzong located at the Zhug Dêqên Qoikor Monastery in Naiser, Gangdoi Town used between 14th century to 17th century. It was, during the 13th and 14th centuries, the seat of Sakya power, in the Tsongpo valley. Built on a hilltop to the west of the Gongkar valley, the Gonggar Dzong or the fortress was destroyed. Until the late 14th century, this area remained an important centre of Sakyapa Order until Tai Situ Changchub Gyaltsen of Pagmodrupa defeated the Ponchen (Administrator of the Sakyapa sect) of Gonggar and secured his power in Tibet.

When the Dzong was under the stewardship of Dorje-denpa Kun-ga Namgyal, who was a well-known Guru he had received training in the Sutra, Tantra and Tantric rituals from masters of all traditions. He was the holder of the Dzongpa tradition of the Sakyapa school. Sitting on the roof of his house in the Gongkar Dzong, when he was reciting the religious scripture, the Vajradhatu, a leaf of the scripture was flown away by wind and it fell at a location where the present Gonggar Choede Monastery is located. The unusual event was further accentuated by the fact that the leaf fell at the location where Atisha (982–1054), had made a Mandala sign with pebbles when he had first visited the place and identified it as the place for a future monastery.
