= List of highways numbered 349 =

The following highways are numbered 349:

== Canada ==
- Manitoba Provincial Road 349
- Nova Scotia Route 349
- Prince Edward Island Route 349
- Quebec Route 349
- Saskatchewan Highway 349

== Japan ==
- Japan National Route 349

== United States ==
- Arkansas Highway 349
- Connecticut Route 349
- Florida State Road 349
  - County Road 349 (Dixie County, Florida)
- Georgia State Route 349 (former)
- Maryland Route 349
- New York:
  - New York State Route 349
  - County Route 349 (Erie County, New York)
- Ohio State Route 349
- Pennsylvania Route 349
- Puerto Rico Highway 349
- Texas:
  - Texas State Highway 349
  - Farm to Market Road 349
- Virginia State Route 349

Preceded by 348	Lists of highways 349	Succeeded by 350
