= Gonggar County =

Gonggar County 贡嘎县 • གོང་དཀར་རྫོང་། Gongkar, Konggar
- County
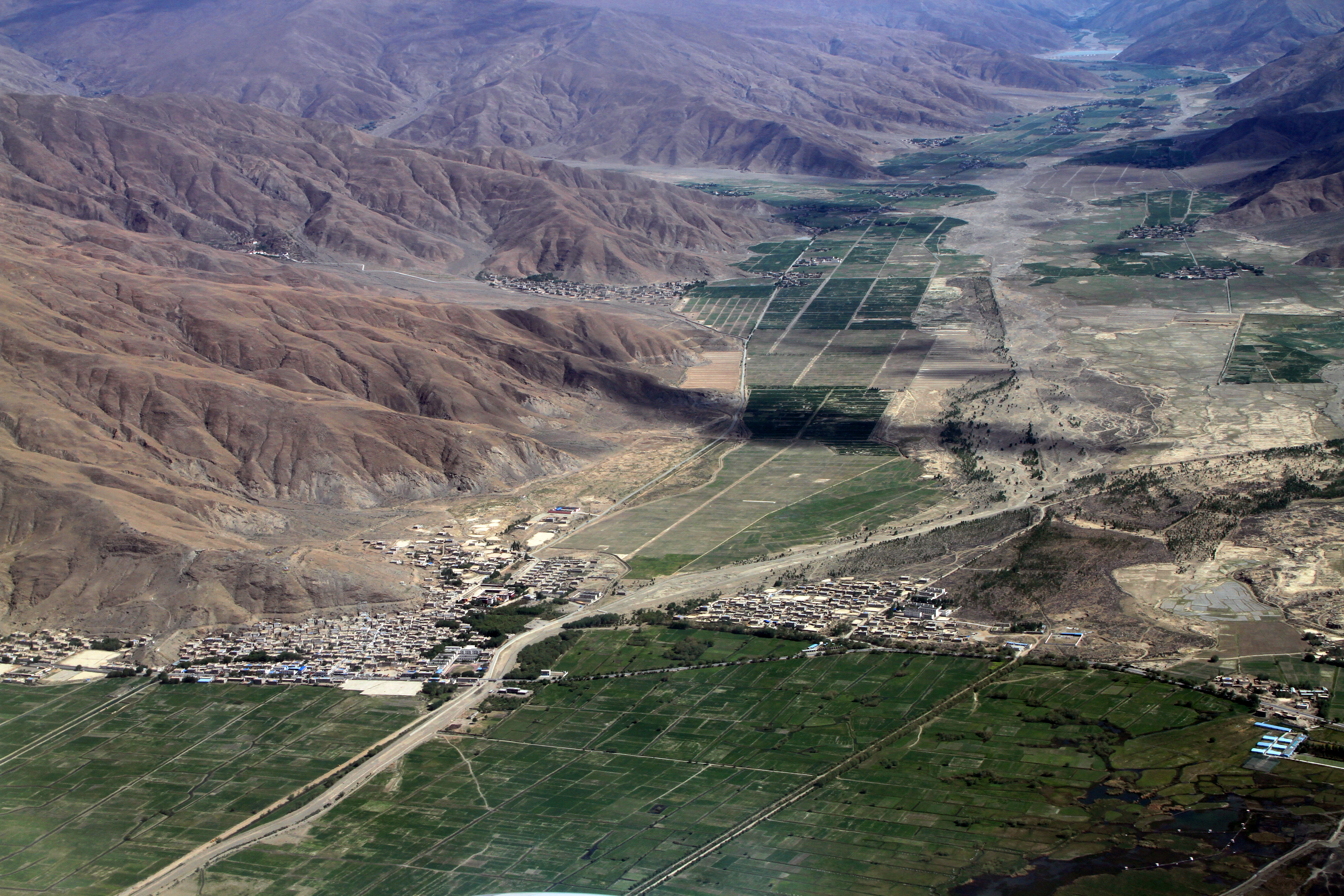
- Lhasa Gonggar Airport

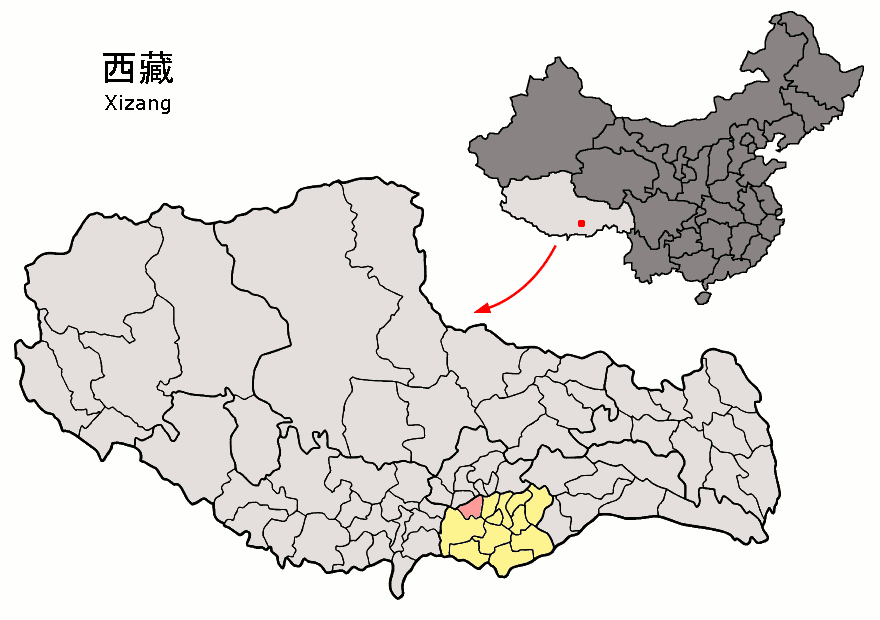
- Location of Gonggar County (red) within Shannan City (yellow) and the Tibet A.R.

- Location of the seat in the Tibet A.R. Gonggar (China)
- Coordinates (Gonggar government): 29°17′20″N 90°59′02″E
- Country: China
- Autonomous region: Tibet
- Prefecture-level city: Shannan (Lhoka)
- County seat: Gyixung

Area
  - Total: 2,283 km^{2} (881 sq mi)

Population (2020)
  - Total: 53,701
  - Density: 23.52/km^{2} (60.92/sq mi)
- Time zone: UTC+8 (China Standard)
- Website: www.gongga.gov.cn

Gonggar County

Chinese name
- Simplified Chinese: 贡嘎县
- Traditional Chinese: 貢嘎縣
Transcriptions
Standard Mandarin
- Hanyu Pinyin: Gònggá Xiàn

Tibetan name
- Tibetan: གོང་དཀར་རྫོང་།
Transcriptions
- Wylie: gong dkar rdzong
- Tibetan Pinyin: Konggar Zong

Gonggar County, also Gongkar (Tibetan: གོང་དཀར་རྫོང་།; Chinese: 贡嘎县), is one of the 12 counties of Shannan in the southeastern part of Tibet Autonomous Region, China. It has under its jurisdiction five towns, four townships, and contains notable landmarks such as the Gonggar Choide Monastery, the Zhug Dêqên Qoikor Monastery, Gangdoi Town, the Gonggar Dzong at Xoi, the Lhasa Gonggar Airport at Gyazhugling, the Tubdain Ramai Monastery and the county seat of Gyixung.

== Legend ==
The fable narrated about this county is that the "first Tibetan was born to the fairy girl, Ruosa and her monkey lover".

== History ==
History of the county came into limelight with the establishment of the Sakyapa school of Tibetan Buddhism. Among the many dzongs and monasteries established in the 14th century, the best known are the Gonngar Dzong and the Gonggar Choede Monastery.

In recent history of the county, during the reform of the late 1950s, Gonggar County was the scene of armed rebellion between the Kamba rebels (under the banner of “four rivers and six mountain ranges”) and the People's Liberation Army of China (PLA); PLA troops were killed and their convoy of army vehicles ambushed here.

== Geography ==
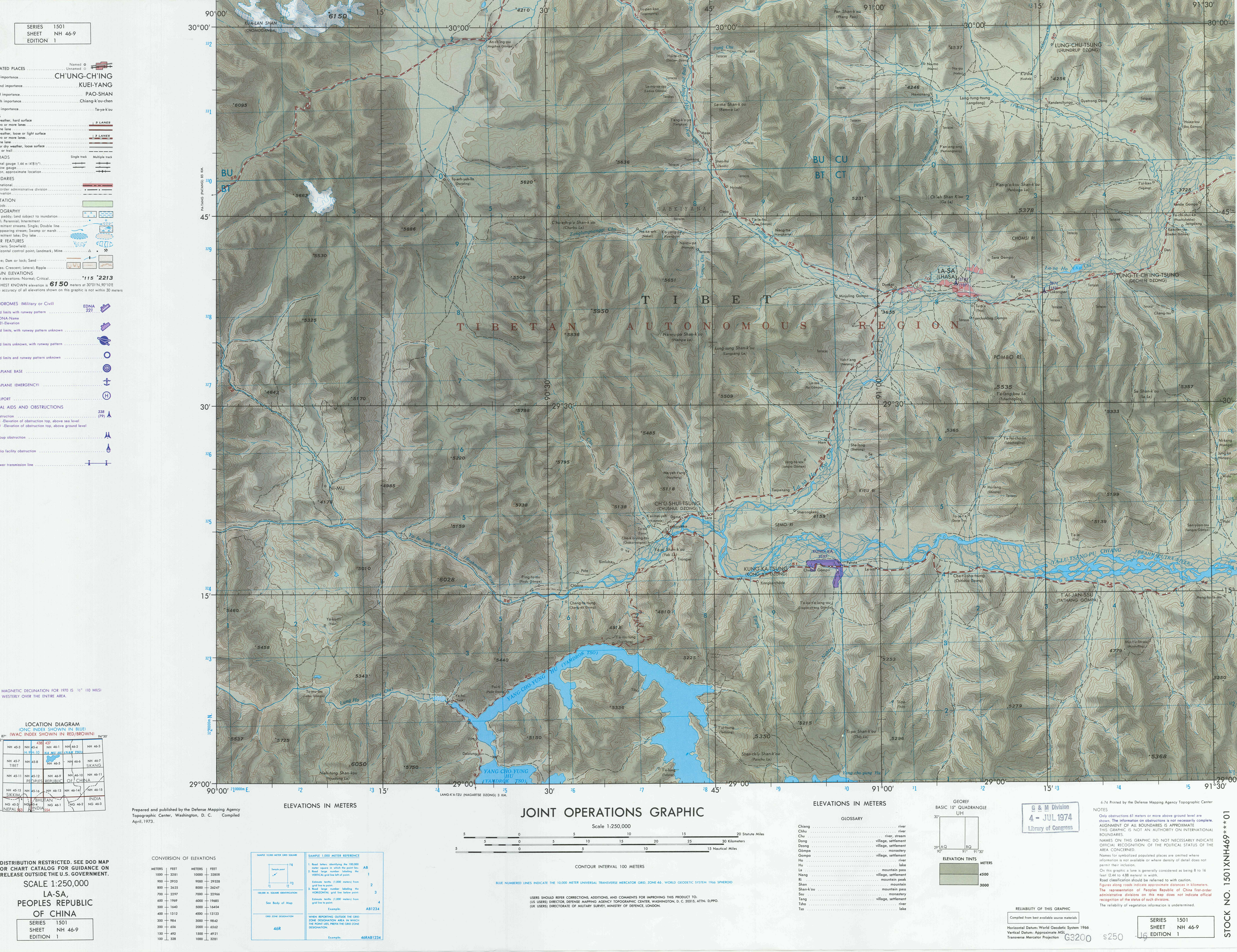

Gonggar County is located in southern Tibet and has a total area of 2,283 square kilometres (881 mi^{2}). The Yarlung Tsangpo River (Brahmaputra River), the mother river of Tibet, flows through the Gonggar County and among other counties of Shannan, and is thus rich in water resources. Set in west to east direction, the county is a plateau land with an average altitude of 3,750 metres (12,300 ft). The Gonggar County is situated at a location where Yarlung Tsangpo River is very wide. It is for this reason that the Gonggar Airport was constructed at this location. The airport lies to the west of Rawa-me, which is the capital of the county at the entry of the Namrab Valley, 96 kilometres (60 mi) from Lhasa and 87 kilometres (54 mi) from Tsetang, the capital of Shannan. The county is bounded by the Mount Chuwaru (held sacred in Tibet) opposite to Chusul, the Gompa La (4,794 kilometres (2,979 mi)) Pass to the south on the route to the sacred Yamdrok Lake in West Tibet, on the east to the limits of the Dal Valley on the south bank of the Brahmaputra and Dorje Monastery on the north bank. The county also envelops the southern side valleys of Namrab and Drib counties and the northern side valleys of Leuchung and Trango counties.

=== Climate ===
Gonggar County has a monsoonal-influenced cool semi-arid climate (Köppen BSk) with four climatic seasons, and a long winter. The average temperature varies from 7.2–8.5 °C (45.0–47.3 °F), with the warmest month average temperature being 15.8 °C (60.4 °F) and the coldest month average temperature −2.2 °C (28.0 °F). The average annual precipitation is 416 millimetres or 16.4 inches with 84 rainy days. The annual sunshine hours are 3,194 and frost-free period is 142 days. It is subject to natural disasters from frequent storms with 40 days of gale days on average – concentrated between February and April. Solar radiation has been recorded as 7,710 MJ/m^{2}.

Climate data for Gonggar, elevation 3,564 m (11,693 ft), (1991–2020 normals)
Month	Jan	Feb	Mar	Apr	May	Jun	Jul	Aug	Sep	Oct	Nov	Dec	Year
Mean daily maximum °C (°F)	9.1 (48.4)	11.4 (52.5)	14.7 (58.5)	17.8 (64.0)	21.2 (70.2)	24.4 (75.9)	23.5 (74.3)	22.6 (72.7)	21.4 (70.5)	18.5 (65.3)	14.2 (57.6)	10.3 (50.5)	17.4 (63.4)
Daily mean °C (°F)	−0.6 (30.9)	2.7 (36.9)	6.5 (43.7)	9.6 (49.3)	13.3 (55.9)	16.6 (61.9)	16.4 (61.5)	15.8 (60.4)	14.1 (57.4)	9.4 (48.9)	3.3 (37.9)	−0.5 (31.1)	8.9 (48.0)
Mean daily minimum °C (°F)	−8.5 (16.7)	−5.5 (22.1)	−1.4 (29.5)	2.3 (36.1)	6.4 (43.5)	10.3 (50.5)	11.4 (52.5)	11.0 (51.8)	9.0 (48.2)	3.1 (37.6)	−4.4 (24.1)	−8.2 (17.2)	2.1 (35.8)
Average precipitation mm (inches)	0.4 (0.02)	0.4 (0.02)	2.0 (0.08)	9.0 (0.35)	23.6 (0.93)	58.1 (2.29)	132.5 (5.22)	116.5 (4.59)	64.3 (2.53)	8.2 (0.32)	0.4 (0.02)	0.7 (0.03)	416.1 (16.4)
Average precipitation days (≥ 0.1 mm)	0.5	0.5	1.4	4.6	8.4	13.9	19.4	18.4	13.0	3.4	0.5	0.2	84.2
Average snowy days	1.1	1.2	3.3	3.7	0.6	0	0	0	0.1	0.6	0.7	0.3	11.6
Average relative humidity (%)	33	28	30	39	45	52	64	66	64	51	42	40	46
Mean monthly sunshine hours	254.9	239.9	267.2	265.9	286.6	268.2	232.0	231.5	243.0	276.4	266.7	264.0	3,096.3
Percentage possible sunshine	78	76	71	68	68	64	55	57	67	79	84	83	71
Source: China Meteorological Administration

==== Vegetation ====
The forest area in the county is 520,000 hectares (1,300,000 acres) and of grassland area is 19 hectares (47 acres). The main crops and vegetables grown are barley, winter wheat, spring wheat, pea, broad bean, rape, radish, potato, Yuan cabbage, tomatoes and cauliflower. Medicinal plants and products in the county are creeping cypress, opulus, ginseng fruits, snow lotus, Chinese caterpillar fungus, Fritillaria, musk and seabuckthorn.

==== Fauna ====
The wildlife species recorded in the county are wild yak, wild ass, Tibetan antelope, Tibetan gazelle, and black-necked cranes. The livestock are mainly yak, pianniu, cattle, goats, sheep, horses, donkeys, mules and pigs.

== Economy ==
The county has predominantly an agricultural economy and is considered the grain base of Shannan. Tourism also adds to the economic development of the county.

Economic progress is witnessed in the county in all sectors of economy. In recent years, the county has held five Trade fairs and 3 cultural fairs to promote local products and Tibetan handicrafts.

Energy

The energy resources of the county consist of the two functioning hydropower stations with generating capacity of 530 MWh. The Yamzhog pumped storage power station with installed capacity of 90 MW is under construction.

Handicrafts

The famous apron, which the Tibetan married women wear, is a handicraft of the Gonggar County in the Jiedexiu area and is known as "Jed Show Apron". The county is synonymous with this apron, which has a distinctive and characteristic style, and it is produced here for the last 500 or 600 years.

== Administrative divisions ==
Gonggar County contains 5 town and 4 townships.

Name	Chinese	Hanyu Pinyin	Tibetan	Wylie
Towns
Kyishong Town (Gyixung)	吉雄镇	Jíxióng zhèn	སྐྱིད་གཤོངས་གྲོང་རྡལ།	skyid gshongs grong rdal
Gyadrukling Town	甲竹林镇	Jiǎzhúlín zhèn	རྒྱ་དྲུག་གླིང་གྲོང་རྡལ།	gya drug gling grong rdal
Chede Zhöl Town	杰德秀镇	Jiédéxiù zhèn	ལྕེ་བདེ་ཞོལ་གྲོང་རྡལ།	lce bde zhol grong rdal
Göntö Town	岗堆镇	Gǎngduī zhèn	དགོན་སྟོད་གྲོང་རྡལ།	dgon stod grong rdal
Qangtang Town	江塘镇	Jiāngtáng zhèn	བྱང་ཐང་གྲོང་རྡལ།	byang thang grong rdal
Townships
Namgyel Zhöl Township	朗杰学乡	Lǎngjiéxué xiāng	རྣམ་རྒྱལ་ཞོལ་ཤང་།	rnam rgyal zhol shang
Chênggo Township	昌果乡	Chāngguǒ xiāng	འཕྲེང་གོ་ཤང་།	'phreng go shang
Dongra Township	东拉乡	Dōnglā xiāng	སྟོང་རྭ་ཤང་།	stong rwa shang
Kyimxi Township	克西乡	Kèxī xiāng	ཁྱིམ་བཞི་ཤང་།	khyim bzhi shang

== Demographics ==
Gonggar County has a geographical area of 2,283 square kilometres (881 mi^{2}), with a total population of 53,701 (2020), which gives a population density of 21 per km^{2}.

== Landmarks ==
As a location of ancient culture and its position in the history of Tibet, Gonggar County has historical monuments, a Buddhist monastery, natural geological features such as lakes and caves, and religiously linked mountains.

Dorje Drak / Dorjezha monastery

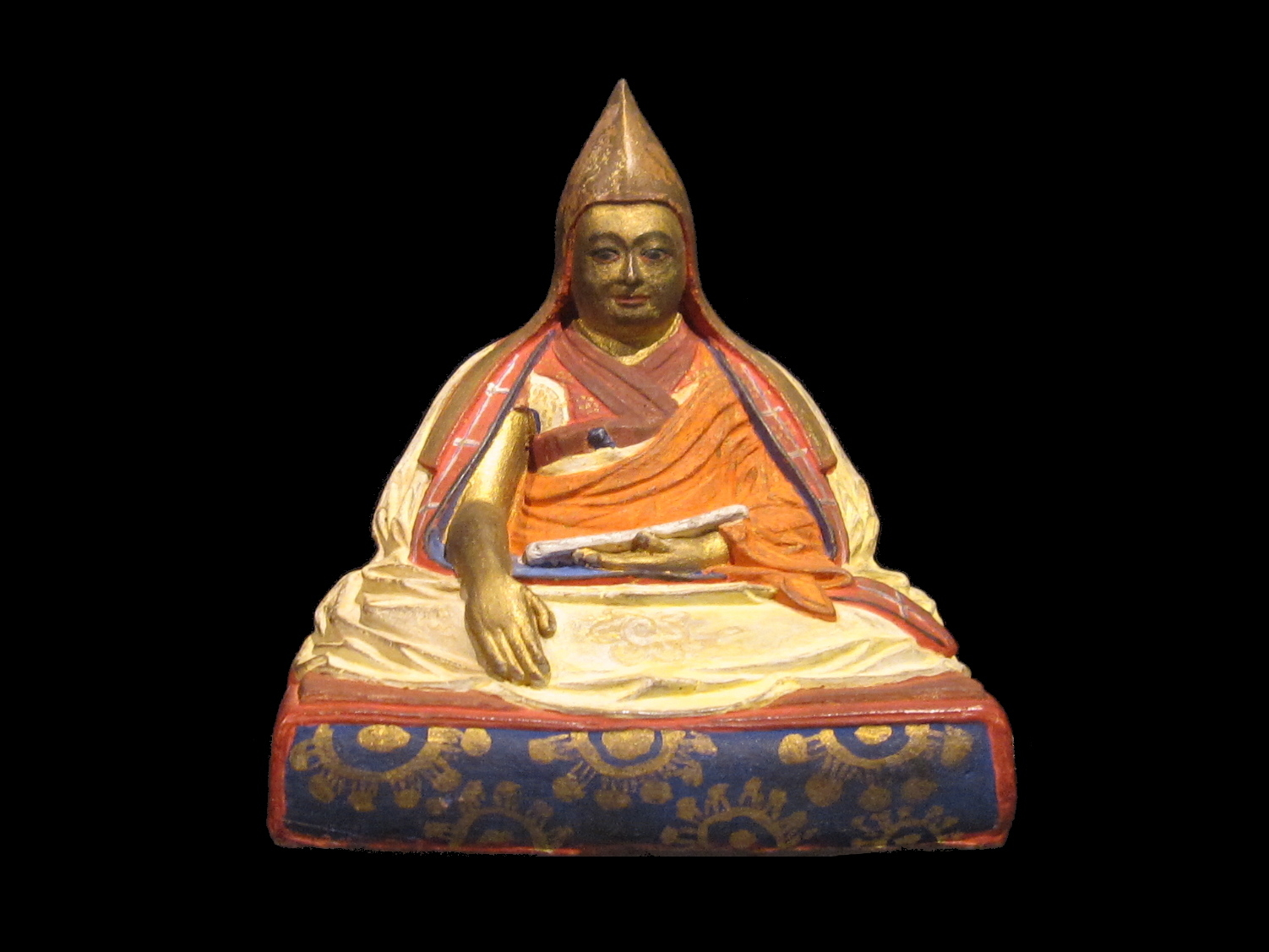
The Fifth Dalai Lama, instrumental in enlarging the Dorjezha Monastery

Dorjezha Monastery, situated on a hilltop, blends well with the rock setting and is named after the rock known as Vraja, the green coloured gemstones found behind the monastery. The literal meaning of ‘Dorjezha’ is “Diamond Hill.” It was initially built on modest lines, on the right bank of the Yarlung River by a wealthy local man known as Doxie Dorje. The monastery was destroyed completely in 1717 during Zungar invasion of this area. It was, however, rebuilt in 1718. Further, the monastery was supported by the Fifth Dalai Lama and consequently, it underwent major improvements and became one of the famous monasteries of Tibet. At the peak of its popularity, 2000 monks of Nyingma sect resided here; it is known as the only ancestral monastery of the Sakyapa sect. It was substantially damaged during the Cultural Revolution. However, it was rebuilt in 1978. At present, 29 monks reside here, and most of them are from the Gonggar County, except one monk who is from Renbo County of Shigatse Prefecture. The Management system established is democratic, with each individual member of the Management Commission made responsible for particular tasks such as religious activities, finance and daily matters. It maintains close interaction with the Choqin Monastery (Dêgê County in Sichuan province) also of the Nyigma sect and both follow the same teaching and practicing of Buddhist tenets. In this monastery, the practice of the “Reincarnation of the Living Buddha” is followed and hence it has the name of Renchenqinmo Dorjeza Jambeilobsam Gyinmeinamzogyacho and the present Living Buddha is the 10th Reincarnation in this lineage, and as result this monastery has huge reputation among the adherents of Tibetan Buddhism.

Mao Zedong statue

A large statue of Mao Zedong has been installed in the Gonggar County in Gonggar town. The statue was erected by contributions made by the people of Hunan Province, where Mao was born. The statue, erected in honour of the Chairman Mao, was in gratitude for the people of his hometown. The statue is erected on a 5.16 metres (16.9 ft) pedestal is 7.1 metres (23 ft) tall and weighs 35 tonnes and made in granite. It cost 480,000 yuan (US$60,000).

Gyaideshiu town

Gyaideshiu town (also spelt Jiedexiu Town) is famous for the Gyaideshiu 'Bangdian' apron not only among women in Tibet but also is in demand in Nepal, India, Bhutan and Western Europe. The town is located in the county, 16 kilometres (9.9 mi) to its east on the highway towards Zetang. Bangdian" is an apron of China's Tibetan ethnic group with historic heritage of 1,500 years of hand weaving. This weaving technique is designated as "China's state-level intangible cultural heritage."

== Transport ==
There are two National Highways passing through the county, apart from several rural network of roads. The county is also famous for the Lhasa Gonggar Airport.
