= Ghantapada =

- Town
- Location in Odisha, India Ghantapada (India)
- Coordinates: 20.93°N 85.18°E
- Country: India
- State: Odisha
- District: Angul

Government
  - Type: panchayat

Population (2001)
  - Total: 15,587

Languages
  - Official: Odia
- Time zone: UTC+5:30 (IST)
- Vehicle registration: OD 35
- Website: odisha.gov.in

Ghantapada is a census town in Talcher of Angul district in the state of Odisha, India.

== Demographics ==
As of 2001 India census, Ghantapada had a population of 15,587. Males constitute 54% of the population and females 46%. Ghantapada has an average literacy rate of 71%, higher than the national average of 59.5%: male literacy is 78%, and female literacy is 63%. In Ghantapada, 14% of the population is under 6 years of age.
