= New York State Route 347 (disambiguation) =

New York State Route 347 is an east–west state highway in Suffolk County, New York, United States, that was established in 1966.

New York State Route 347 may also refer to:

- New York State Route 347 (1930–1934) in Essex County, on Crown Point
- New York State Route 347 (1934–1950s) in Essex County, near Ticonderoga
