= Xôi =

Vietnamese rice dish

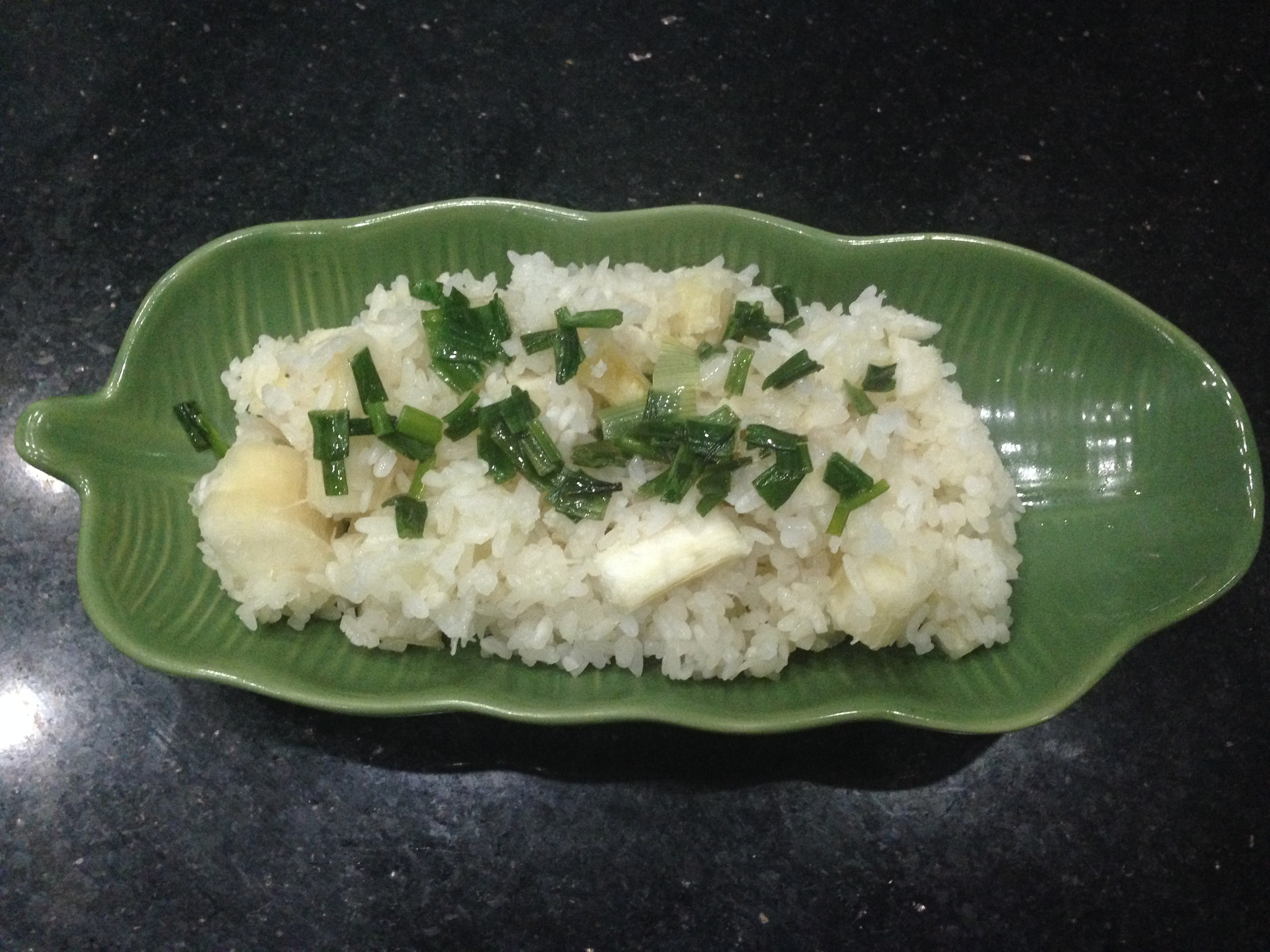
- Xôi with boiled cassava, liquid fat, and onion.
- Type: Cơm
- Course: Gạo nếp
- Place of origin: Vietnam
- Associated cuisine: Vietnamese cuisine
- Created by: Tai tribes
- Invented: Middle Ages
- Serving temperature: Hot or at room temperature.
- Main ingredients: Sticky rice and pure water.
- Ingredients generally used: Salt
- Variations: Bánh bỏng, bánh chưng, bánh giầy, bánh đòn, bánh lá liễu, bánh ít, chè lam, cốm, cơm lam, cơm rượu, kem xôi, xôi chè

Xôi (Vietnamese pronunciation: [soj˧˧]) is a traditional Vietnamese dish made of sticky rice.

With a history tracing back to Tai tribes in Southeast Asia, sticky rice became a staple crop in Vietnam, partly due to the region's suitability for its growth. While somewhat replaced by other forms of rice which are easier to grow, it is still eaten in the modern era, prepared in a variety of different ways.

== History ==
The origins of the customs surrounding xôi are still debated. Although India and China are thought to be the foundation of modern East Asian and Southeast Asian culture, sticky rice and its customs rarely appear in either region. Instead, Southeast Asia has shown independent development of sticky rice, with each country or ethnic group having different ways of processing and consuming it.

The customs related to sticky rice have followed the Tai tribes from Yunnan to the Northwestern region of Vietnam from the beginning of the Christian era. This region is notable for growing sticky rice in Vietnam, partly because this rice variety is only suitable for high terrain with low water. As such, it was known as "the sticky rice zone" (vùng thâm canh lúa nếp). Because of this, sticky rice has become a staple crop in Southeast Asian culture. Over the centuries, xôi – its finished product – has undergone very rich and diverse developments.

=== Etymology ===
Since ancient times, there has been little research to explain the origin of the word "xôi" in the Vietnamese language, or even to identify a form of intertextuality. According to researcher Trần Quang Đức, (Note: Vân Trai Trần Quang Đức, Ngàn năm áo mũ : Lịch sử trang phục Việt Nam giai đoạn 1009–1945, Nhà sách Nhã Nam & Nhà xuất bản Thế Giới, Hà Nội, 2013.) the term refers to a dish made from gạo nếp (sticky rice) as the only ingredient. In Vietnamese dictionaries, this term is classified as a single word, meaning it can only be a noun and not any other part of speech. It should be understood similarly to phở in terms of language function, in that the term refers to a processed dish rather than the plant. (Note: Xôi)

Older terms exist for xôi which are now only used in rural areas, such as "cơm nếp" (Kinh) or "ꪹꪄ꫁ꪱ / khăw-nueng" (Tai), meaning "the meal of sticky rice".

== Use ==
=== Production ===
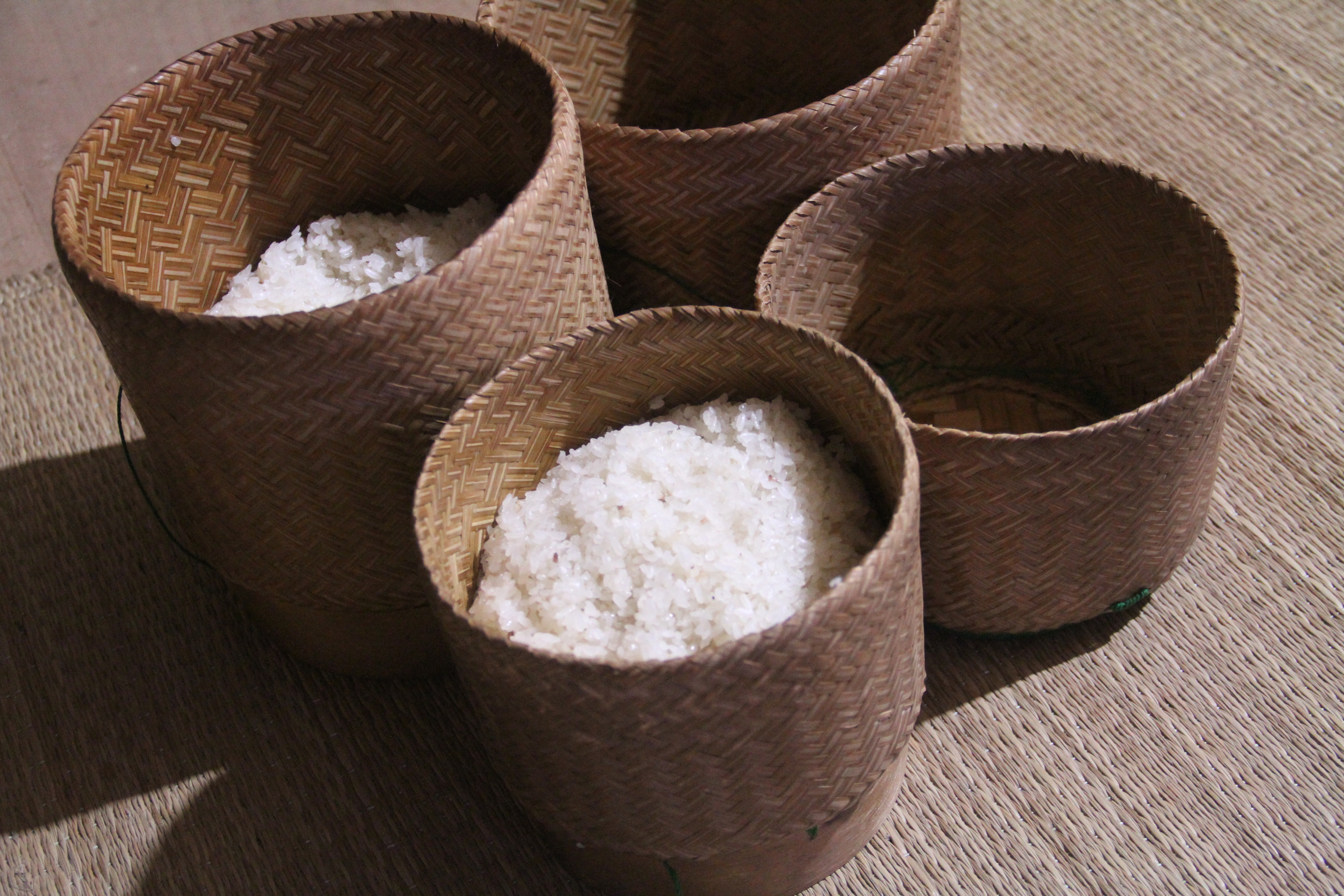
Xôi of Thái people is always stored in baskets (ếp-khăw).

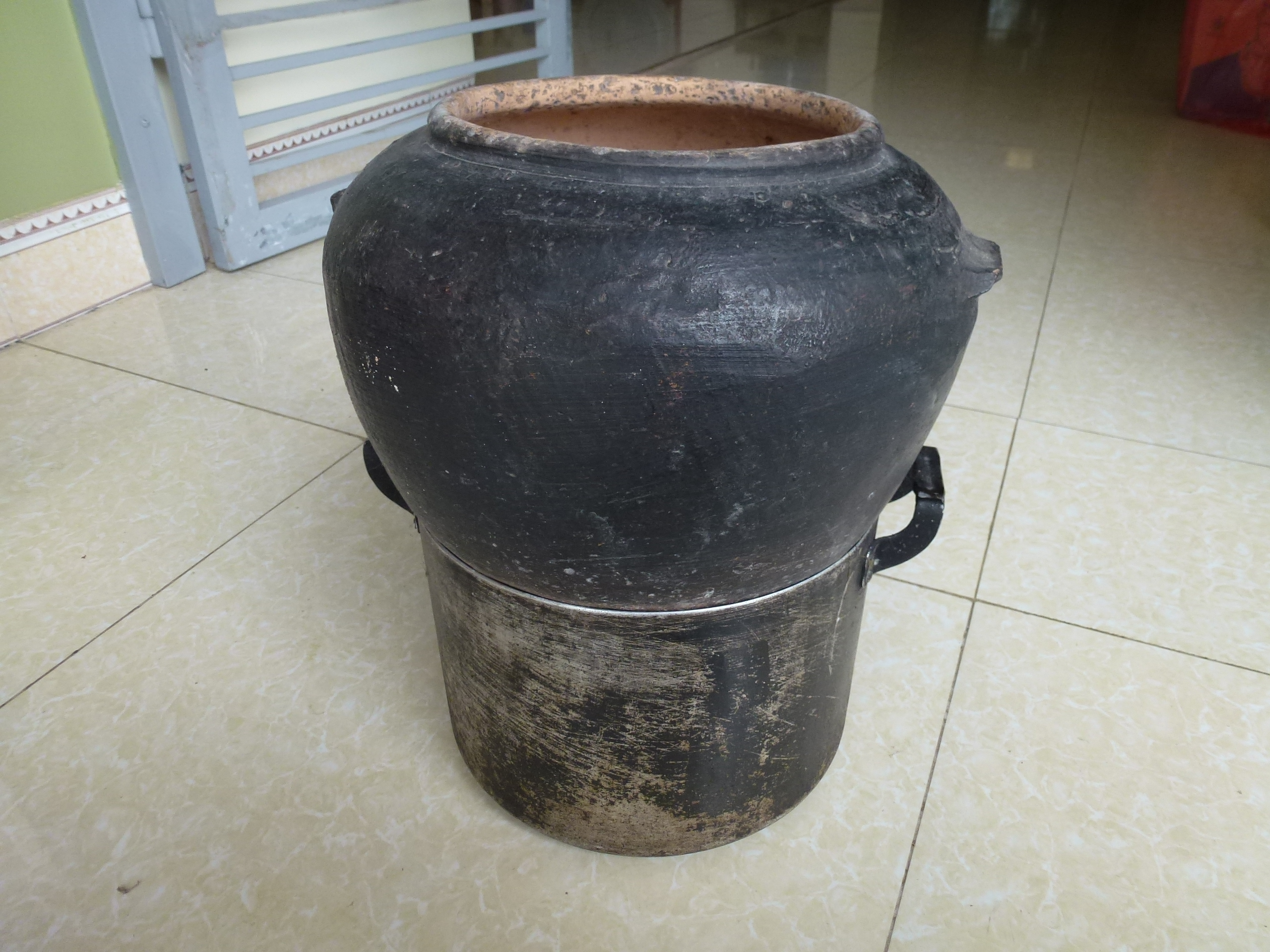
Xôi is usually cooked in ceramic pots to retain its natural flavor.

According to The Foundation of Vietnamese Culture (Cơ sở văn hóa Việt Nam, 1995) by Trần Ngọc Thêm, (Note: Trần Ngọc Thêm. Cơ sở văn hóa Việt Nam (The Foundation of Vietnamese Culture), 504 pages. Published by Nhà xuất bản Đại học Tổng hợp TPHCM. Saigon, Vietnam, 1995.) Vietnamese people likely have a long history of using sticky rice (gạo nếp) as a basic daily food. However, it was inherently difficult to grow and often produced unstable yields, so, over time, it has been replaced by wet rice (gạo tẻ). (Note: According to The Basis of Vietnamese Culture (fp. 1997 – rp. 2006) by Prof. Trần Quốc Vượng and colleagues, the formula for creating traditional Vietnamese cuisine was: Rice, vegetable, fish, meat. In particular, meat appeared later and is also less common.) Wet rice has gradually become the main staple food because of a few advantages: good drought tolerance, a harvest of at least two seasons per year (spring and autumn), and nutritional content. In addition, the price of sticky rice is double the price of wet rice in the agricultural market. This type of rice is often called "gem rice" (gạo ngọc) or even "heavenly rice" (gạo giời) in Vietnamese folklore. This mainly comes from its round, white, and glossy shape, as well as the high nutritional content.

Compared with wet rice, sticky rice offers many nutritional advantages but is more difficult to process. First of all, sticky rice must be soaked in pure water (nước sạch) for a night to make its grains bloom bigger, thus ensuring softness after cooking. Before cooking (đồ xôi), sticky rice must continue to soak in salt water (nước muối). In contrast, the lack of salt will cause the grains of sticky rice to be "thin" (gầy), (Note: "Lép" (poor), "gầy" (thin), "chắc" (thick) and "mẩy" (fat) are specialized terms in Vietnamese rice cultivation techniques, what are used to describe the quality of rice grains.) unable to touch the nerves of the taste buds. Therefore, modern Vietnamese folklore has an extra sentence: "If the bread is indispensable in yeast, how can sticky rice lack salt?". (Note: In Vietnamese : "Bánh mì nào thiếu tí men ; Thế thì gạo nếp phải phiền muối thôi".) However, after the process of preliminary processing, until sticky rice becomes xôi, its taste remains unchanged. After all, salt acts as solvents, not spices as many people think.

Xôi can have four flavors: nuttiness (ngùi), flavourless (nhạt), salinity (mặn), and sweetness (ngọt). Nuttiness is widely popular, while sweetness is very rare. The color of pure xôi is white, often called ivory (màu ngà), but it becomes more colorful when mixed with other foods (mostly cereals).

In modern Vietnam, xôi is considered one of the extra dishes (bữa phụ) to give nutrition after hard labor. It is also significant for important life events, such as festivals, weddings, memorials for the deceased, and the Lunar New Year.

=== Consumption ===
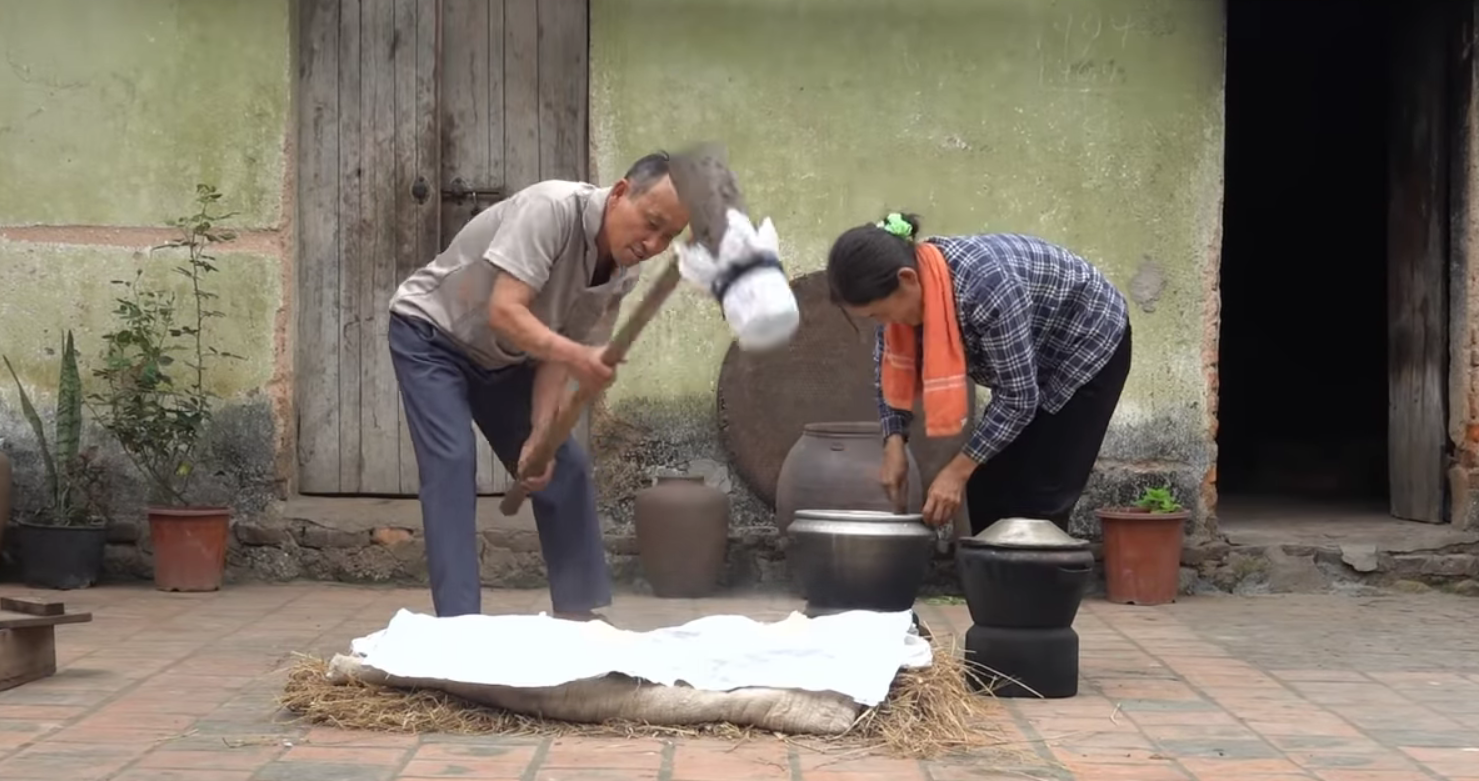
On important occasions, xôi is sometimes compressed with wooden utensils so that it can be kept longer.

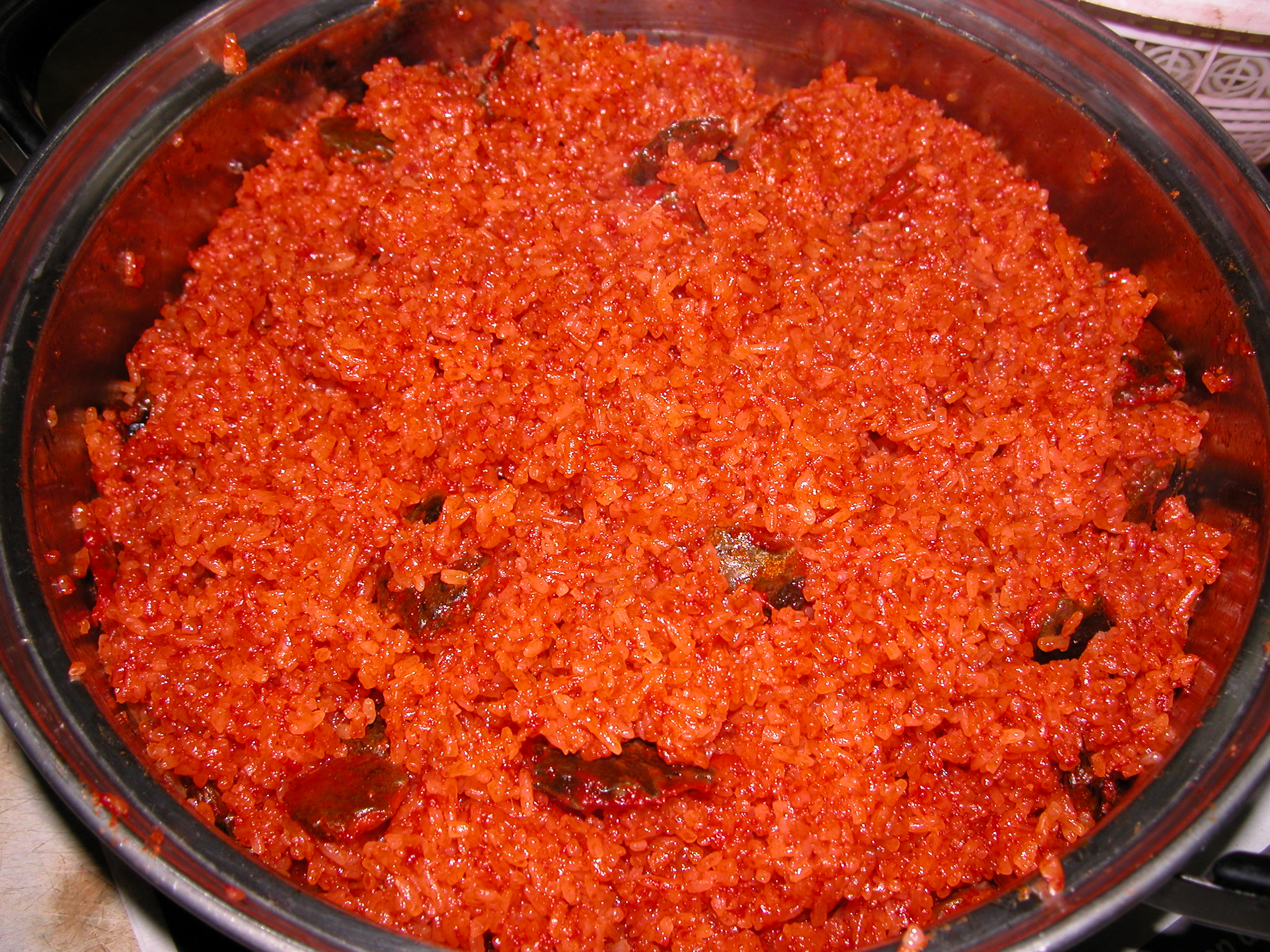
Xôi with gac (red xôi) is often used with the meaning of blessing.

In the most classic and universal form, xôi is usually wrapped in leaves of arrowroot, or sometimes banana and lotus. This method preserves the dish for two (summer) to three (winter) days, which is very convenient for making long journeys. Some people fry xôi in a cast iron pan, although this method is not very popular, as the combination with the heat of metal is generally considered bad for the quality of sticky rice.

The ethnic minority communities in the Northwest mountains of Vietnam have a different way of preparing xôi, which is called "cơm lam" (Note: By ideas of researchers Tạ Chí Đại Trường and Nguyễn Hùng Vỹ : K'lam, kẻ lãm, cổ lãm, cảm lãm, khả lam, gia lâm...) ("forest meal"). It is cooked in neohouzeaua or, sometimes, bamboo tubes rather than pots. During the cooking process, the essential oil of the wood penetrates the sticky rice to supplement fragrance and automatically solidifies into a thin biofilm to hold the rice grains. This practice is not originally due to a lack of pottery, but for convenience in going into the forest for long periods.

Since the early 2010s, due to the influence of Thai tourism culture, there has been a trend among Vietnamese youth to eat xôi with banana, durian, jackfruit, and mango, something that did not exist in previous decades. Its most common use is usually in combination with coconut milk. However, this dish (xôi xiêm, "siam xôi") is only suitable for summer.

According to the Vietnamese philosophy of yin yang, sticky rice is inherently hot food, while wet rice is a mild one. It is therefore not recommended to eat xôi excessively. The claimed symptoms of eating too much xôi include abdominal pain, belching, difficulty excreting, and itchiness. People with certain conditions are recommended not to use xôi as a meal, such as obesity, stomach pain, being stung, serious wounds, high fever, high blood pressure, pregnancy, gaining weight fast, flatulence, and indigestion.

Xôi is usually combined with popular cereals to increase its flavor. Xôi is said to be extremely helpful when served with fish because it overcomes the cold when absorbing dishes originating from the water. (Note: Sushi is always served with xôi to counteract the coldness of the seafoods.) However, xôi is not recommended with chicken, as, according to Vietnamese folklore, these two dishes combined will make worms grow very quickly in the human body. In addition, some other ingredients are also recommended not to be combined with xôi, such as chili, pepper, mustard, garlic, chicken eggs, beef, and especially dog meat. Xôi is also not recommended for cakes, as its stickiness can cause choking if pureed. However, due to sticky rice's highest nutritional content of cereals, physicians often recommend the use of xôi for sick people or women who have just given birth. It is thought to stimulate the strength of the mother's condition and especially the milk gland, which is very beneficial for babies.

== Culture ==
Despite becoming less significant in everyday dishes, xôi remains significant to the Vietnamese people. It is a priority food for the deities and ancestors on every big occasion. It is also the main ingredient to make bánh chưng, bánh tét, and bánh giầy, which are very important in the Tết Nguyên Đán.

Before synthetic glue was developed, xôi was used by Vietnamese people as a specialized, inexpensive glue. However, it was only useful for paper and some thin items made from bamboo, such as hand fans, paper lanterns, and paintings.

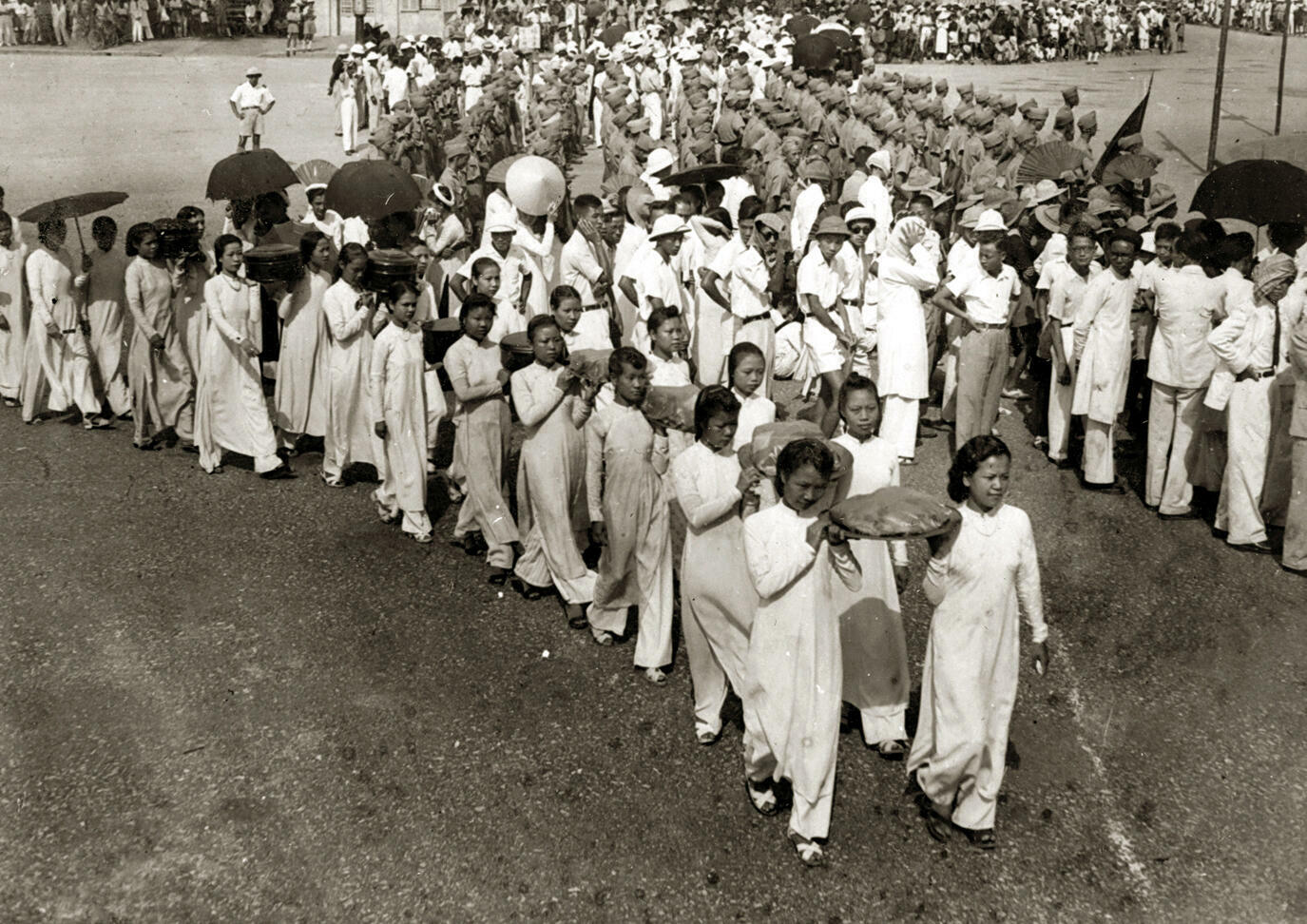
Group offering red xôi trays to the altar of Saint Trần in autumn 1945.

- In October 1945, to celebrate the Declaration of Independence of New Vietnam, the people of Hanoi made 100 red xôi trays to offer to the altar of Saint Trần, who was considered the forefather of the Vietnamese ethnic groups.
- Nam Định City is often known in travel guides as "the capital of xôi" (thủ đô xôi) in Vietnam. This comes from the abundance of the quality and way of processing xôi in the Old Quarters inside the city.
- Hmong and Yao families in Vietnam often put a bowl of xôi with a few pieces of boiled pork at the door every night at the end of the year to invite the forest spirits (ma rừng) for eating.
- Before entering an exam, people are often given xôi with beans (xôi đỗ/xôi đậu) by their parents. Because the pronunciation of "bean" (đỗ/đậu) is homogeneous with that of "passing [the exam]" (thi đỗ/thi đậu) in the Vietnamese language, this is a way to wish luck.
- According to Vietnamese law, death row inmates are allowed two hours (Note: From 3:00 to 5:00 AM.) to enjoy a last meal (cơm đoạn đầu) before serving their sentence. Its composition consists of xôi with beans and chả (Vietnamese sausage).
- In the Vietnamese language, the raspberry is called quả mâm-xôi or trái mâm-xôi (meaning "fruit of xôi tray") because of its shape. Similarly, the florist's daisy is called the cúc mâm-xôi (meaning "daisy of xôi tray").

=== Varieties ===
Due to the diversity and richness of ways to prepare and display xôi, there are currently no official statistics on the number of dishes made from it. However, according to authors Thạch Lam (Note: Thạch Lam, Hà Nội băm sáu phố phường, Đời Nay Publishing, Hà Nội, 1943.), Vũ Bằng, (Note: Vũ Bằng, Miếng ngon Hà Nội, Nam Chi Tùng Thư Publishing, Sài Gòn, 1960.) and Toan Ánh, (Note: Toan Ánh work series : Nếp cũ, Nếp xưa, Phong tục Việt Nam, Việt Nam chí lược.) xôi can be classified into several groups according to form.

1. White xôi (xôi suông): The simplest and most common form. However, it is sometimes combined with fat, onions, and fish sauce to enhance the flavor.
2. Betel-flower xôi (xôi hoa cau): Mung beans cooked with xôi which bloom like speckled flowers.
3. Pudding xôi (xôi chè): Xôi with beans after cooking is then combined with chè (a pudding of cassava and coconut milk).
4. Colory xôi (xôi màu): Combined with cereals and lotus grains to create eye-catching colors.
5. Meat xôi (xôi thịt): Contains pork and/or quail, sometimes chicken and eggs.
6. Fish xôi (xôi cá): Usually contains fish and shrimp.
7. Fruit xôi (xôi xiêm): Xôi combined with popular fruits and lots of coconut milk for sweetness.

=== Flavors ===
(Note: The following reviews are superficial)

Savory

Savory xôi are called xôi mặn in Vietnamese. They include the following varieties:

- Xôi ngô or xôi bắp – xôi made with corn and smashed cooked mung beans.
- Xôi cá – fried fish xôi.
- Xôi chiên phồng – deep-fried xôi.
- Xôi gà – xôi with chicken.
- Xôi khúc – xôi with a mung bean filling with a coating of pandan leave paste.
- Xôi lạc (northern Vietnamese name; called xôi đậu phộng in southern Vietnam) – xôi with peanuts.
- Xôi lạp xưởng or xôi lạp xường – xôi served with Chinese sausage, meat floss, and boiled quail egg.
- Xôi pate – xôi served with pâté and ham.
- Xôi sắn or xôi khoai mì – xôi cooked with cassava.
- Xôi thập cẩm – subgum xôi.
- Xôi thịt kho – xôi served with thịt kho tàu (caramelized pork and eggs).
- Xôi trứng – xôi served with fried eggs, caramelized eggs, or an omelet.
- Xôi xéo – xôi served with smashed mung beans, fried onions, and rousong.
- Xôi xíu mại – xôi served with siu mai.

Sweet

Sweet xôi is called xôi ngọt in Vietnamese. They include the following varieties:

- Xôi bắp – xôi made with corn, sugar, fried onions, and smashed cooked mung beans.
- Xôi đậu đen – xôi made with black urad beans.
- Xôi đậu xanh – xôi made with mung beans.
- Xôi dừa – xôi made with coconut.
- Xôi gấc – xôi made with the aril and seeds of the gấc fruit.
- Xôi lá cẩm (also called xôi tím) – xôi made with the magenta plant.
  - Xôi lá cẩm đậu xanh – xôi made with the magenta plant and mung beans.
- Xôi lá dứa – xôi made with pandan leaf extract for the green color and a distinctive pandan flavor.
- Xôi lúa – xôi with boiled waxy maize, fried shallots, and mung bean paste.
- Xôi nếp than – xôi made with black glutinous rice.
- Xôi ngũ sắc – 5-colored xôi: purple from the leaf extract of the magenta plant, green from pandan leaf, red from gấc fruit, yellow from mung beans, and the white color of natural glutinous rice.
- Xôi nhộng – xôi made with silkworms.
- Xôi sầu riêng – xôi made with durian.
- Xôi vị – hard-cooked xôi with pandan leaves.
- Xôi vò – the glutinous rice grains do not stick together in this type of xôi, as they are coated with ground, peeled, and boiled mung beans.
- Xôi xoài – xôi made with coconut milk and fresh ripe mango; of Thai origin.

== Gallery ==
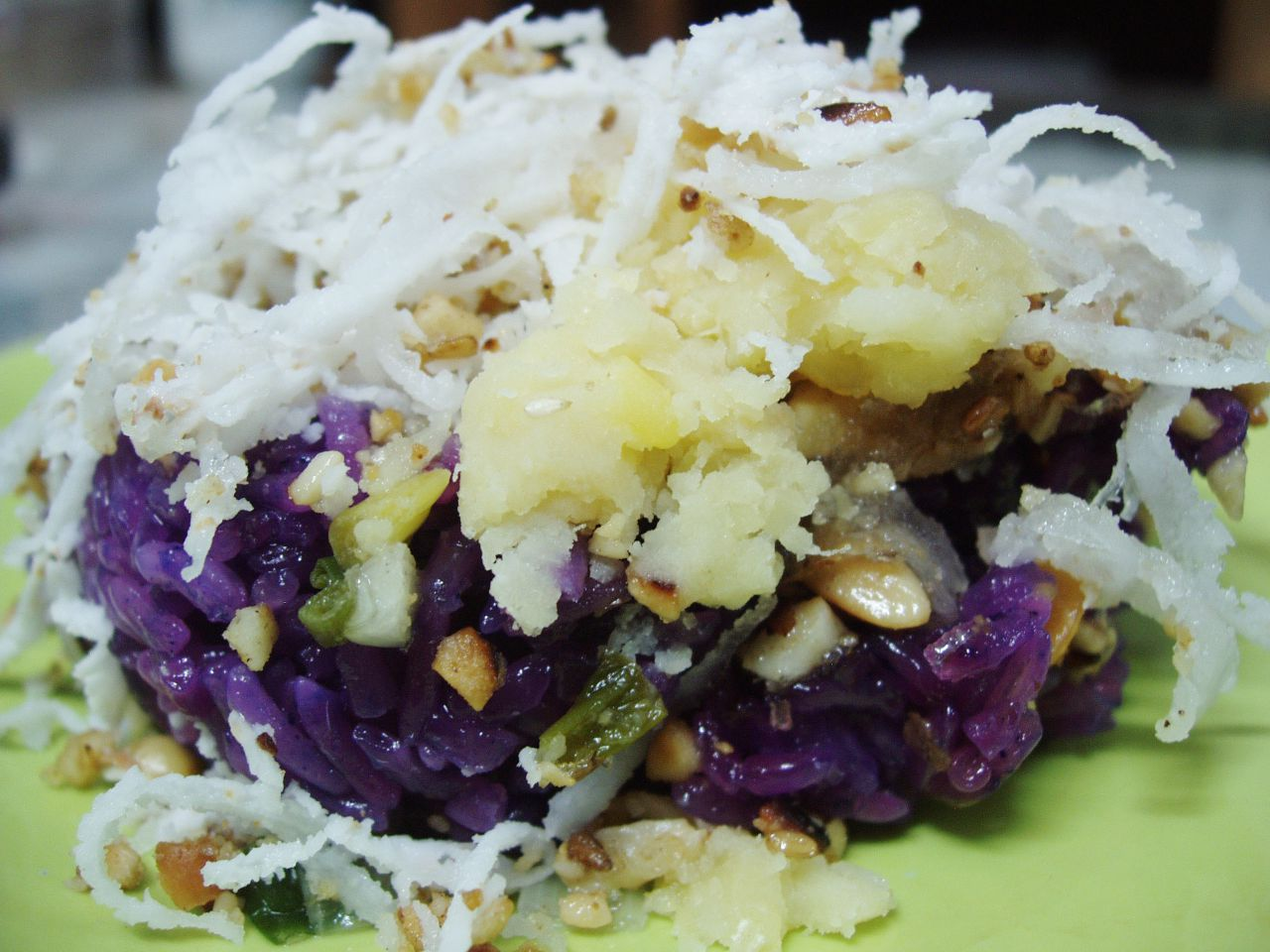
Purple xôi (Xôi lá cẩm)

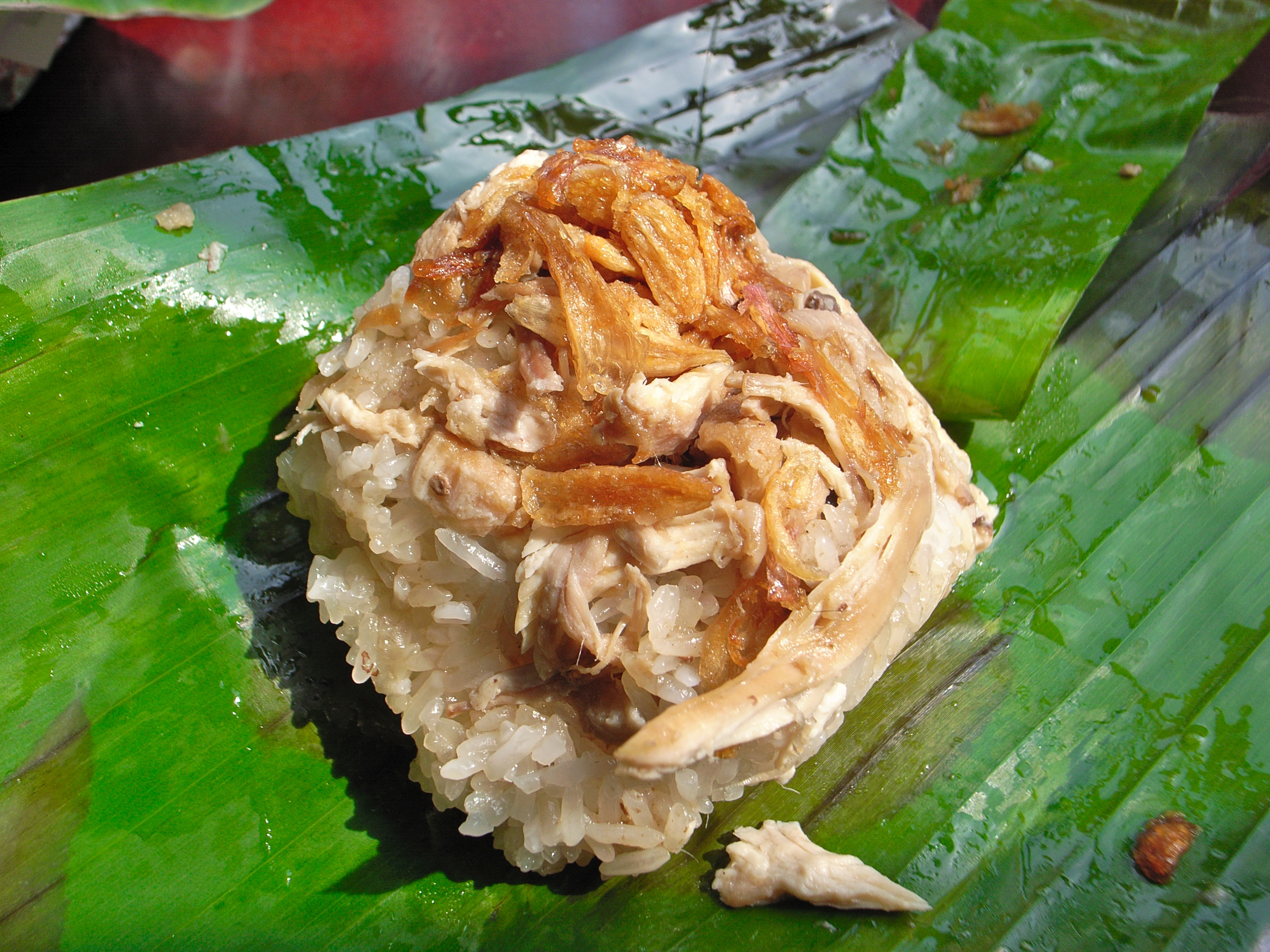
Xôi with chicken (Xôi gà)

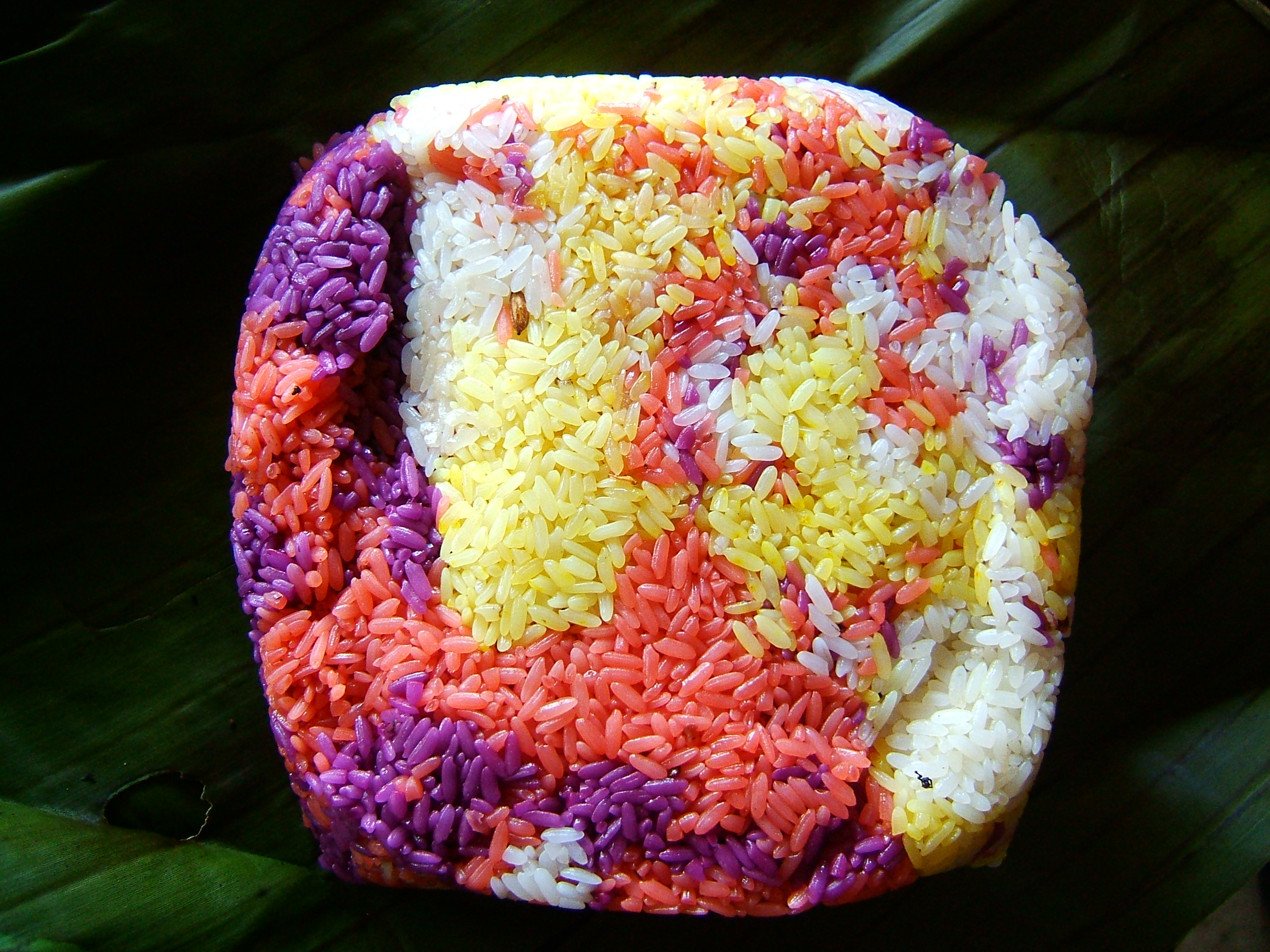
Five-coloured xôi (Xôi ngũ sắc)

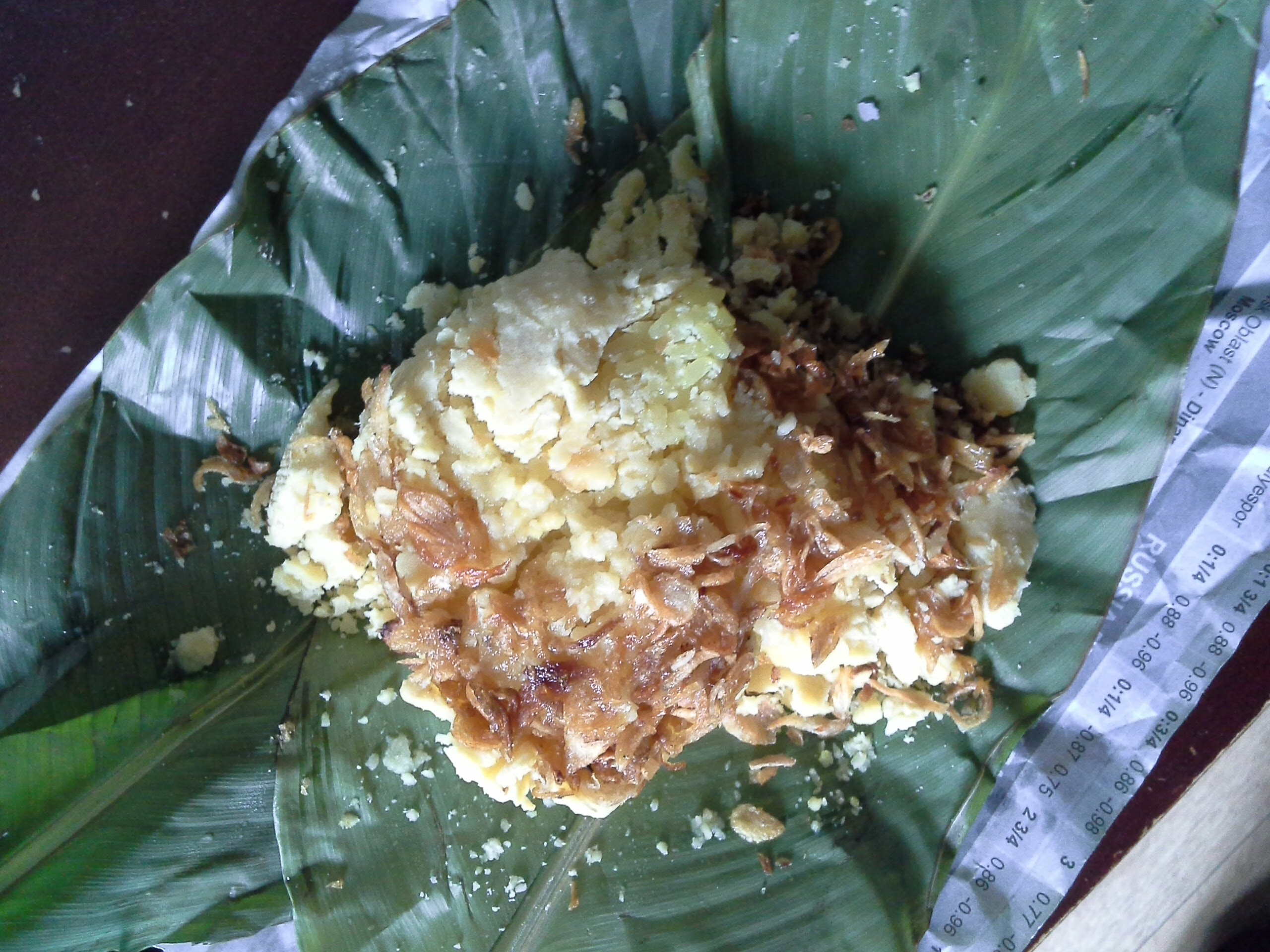
Cutting xôi (Xôi xéo)

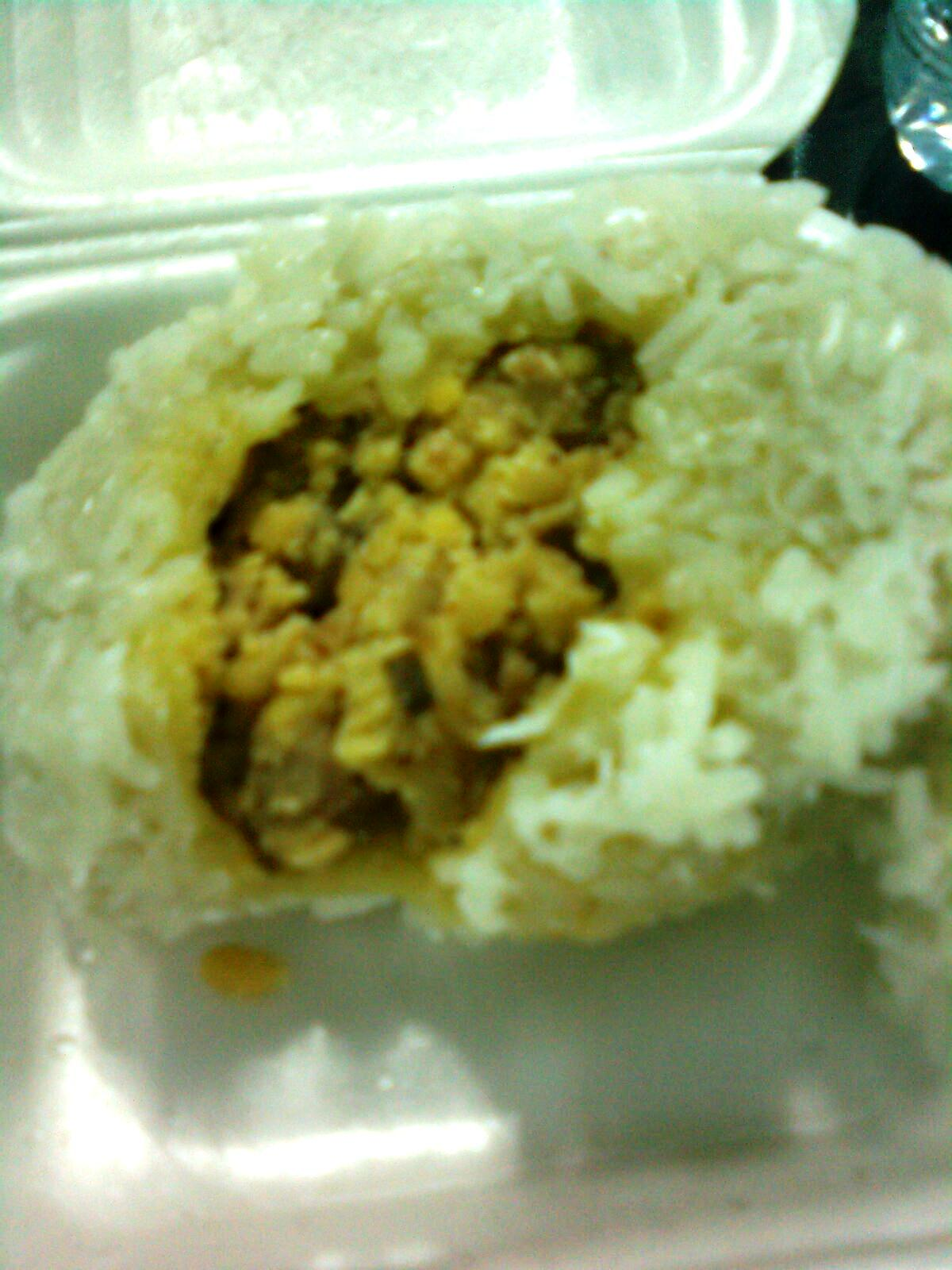
Xôi with bean flour (Xôi khúc)

Deep-fried xôi (Xôi chiên phồng, Xôi chiên Sài Gòn)

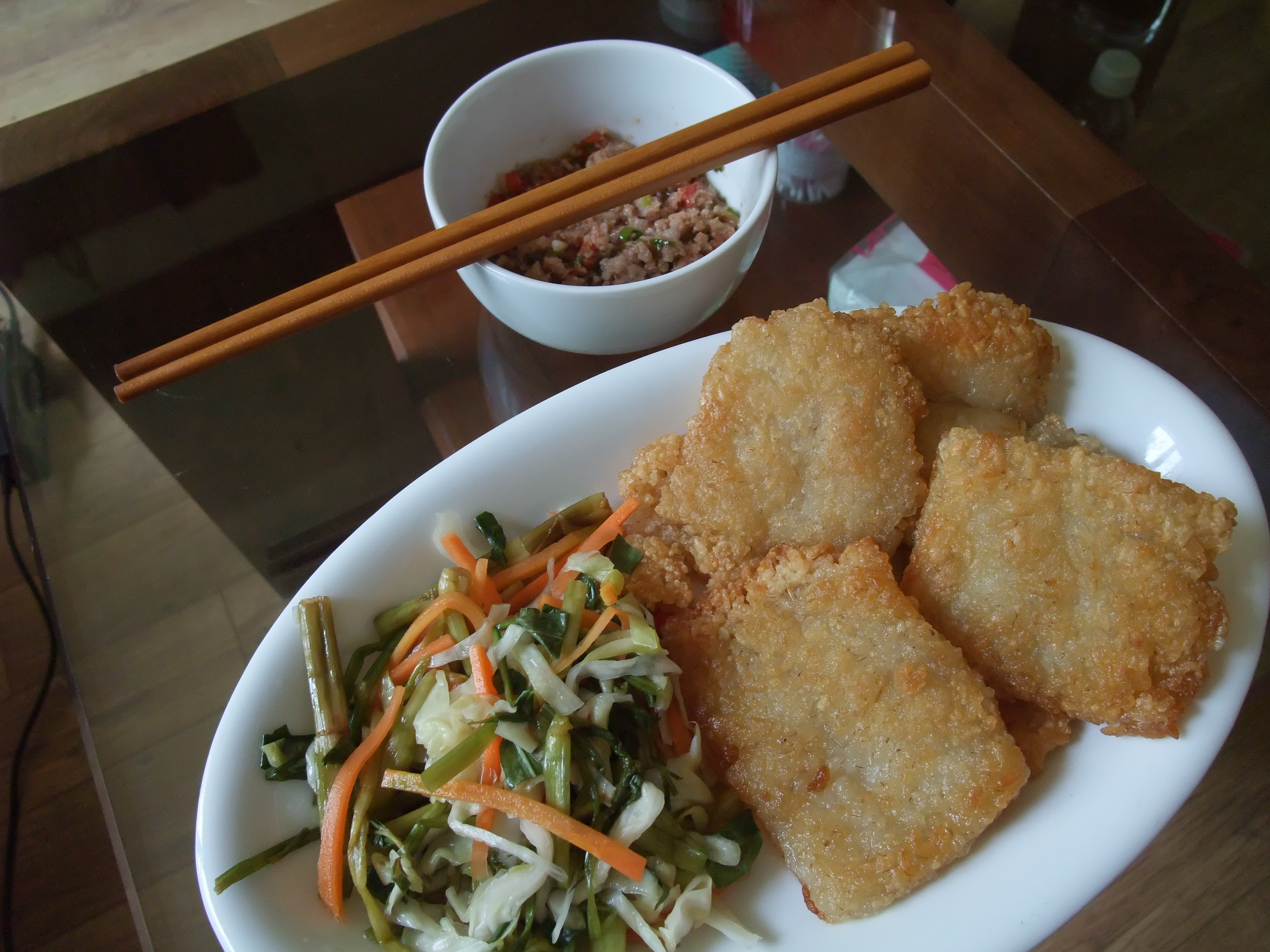
Fried xôi (Xôi chiên)

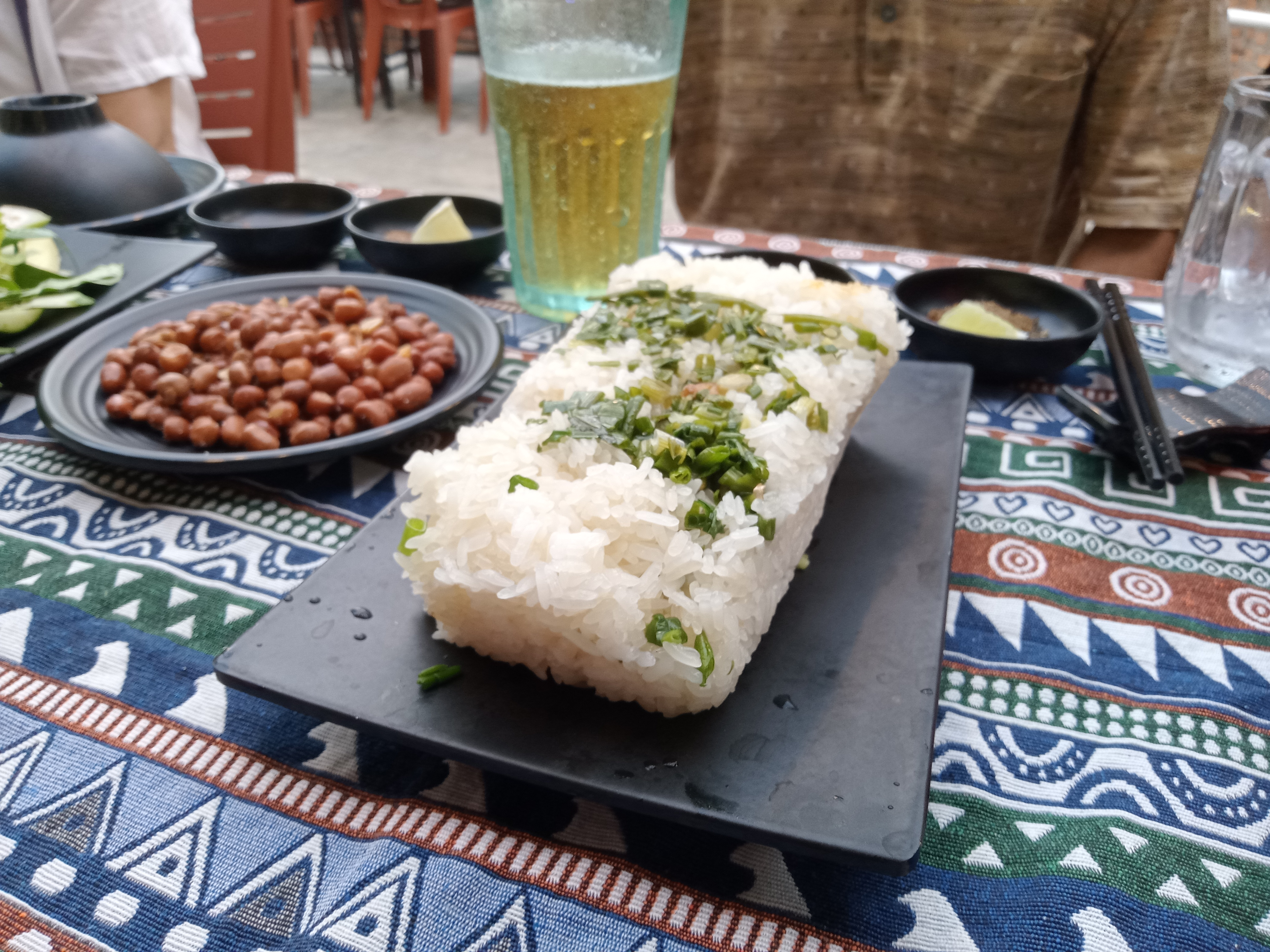
Xôi with fat and onions (Xôi mỡ hành)

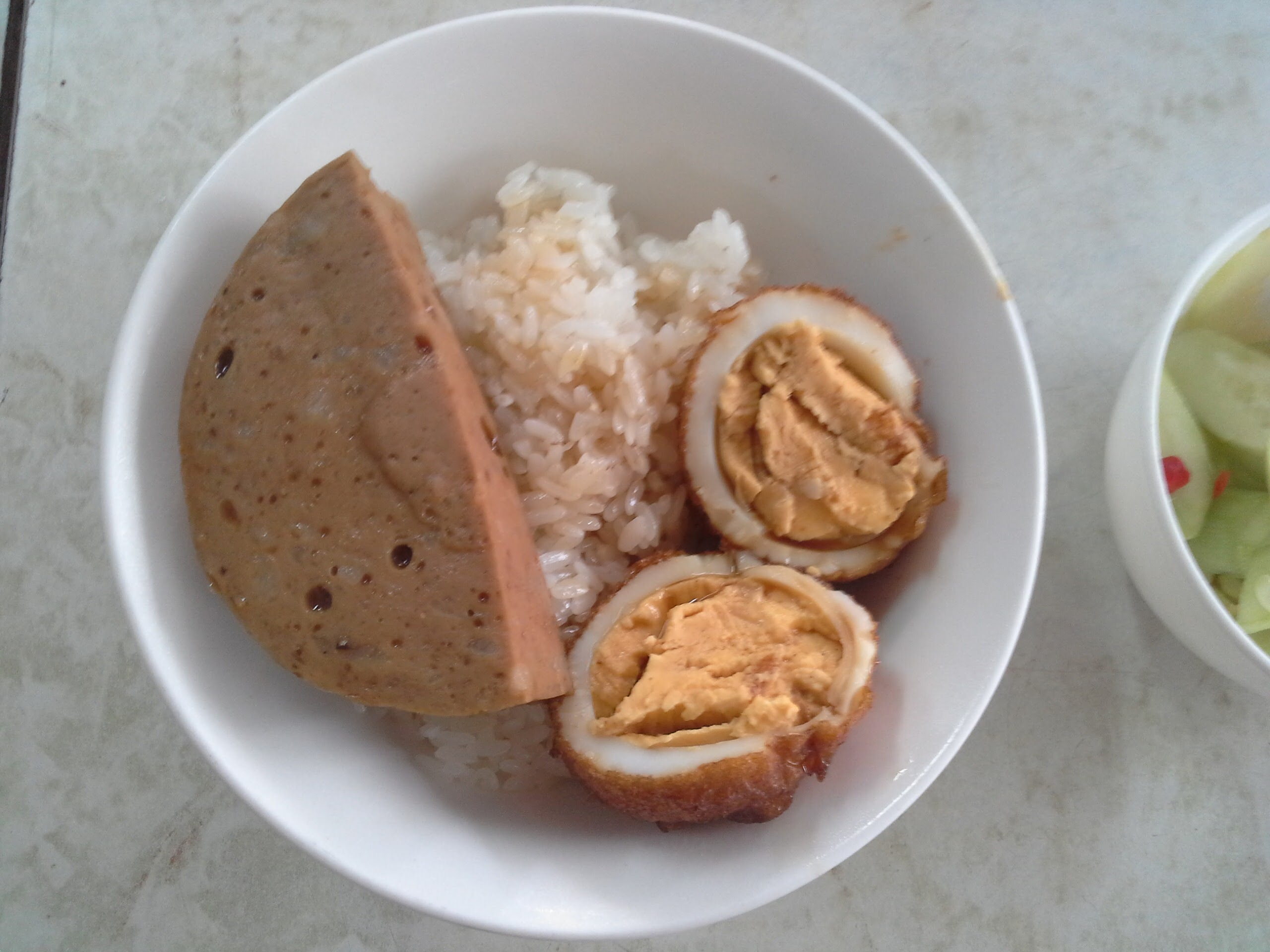
Xôi with giò and eggs (Xôi giò trứng)

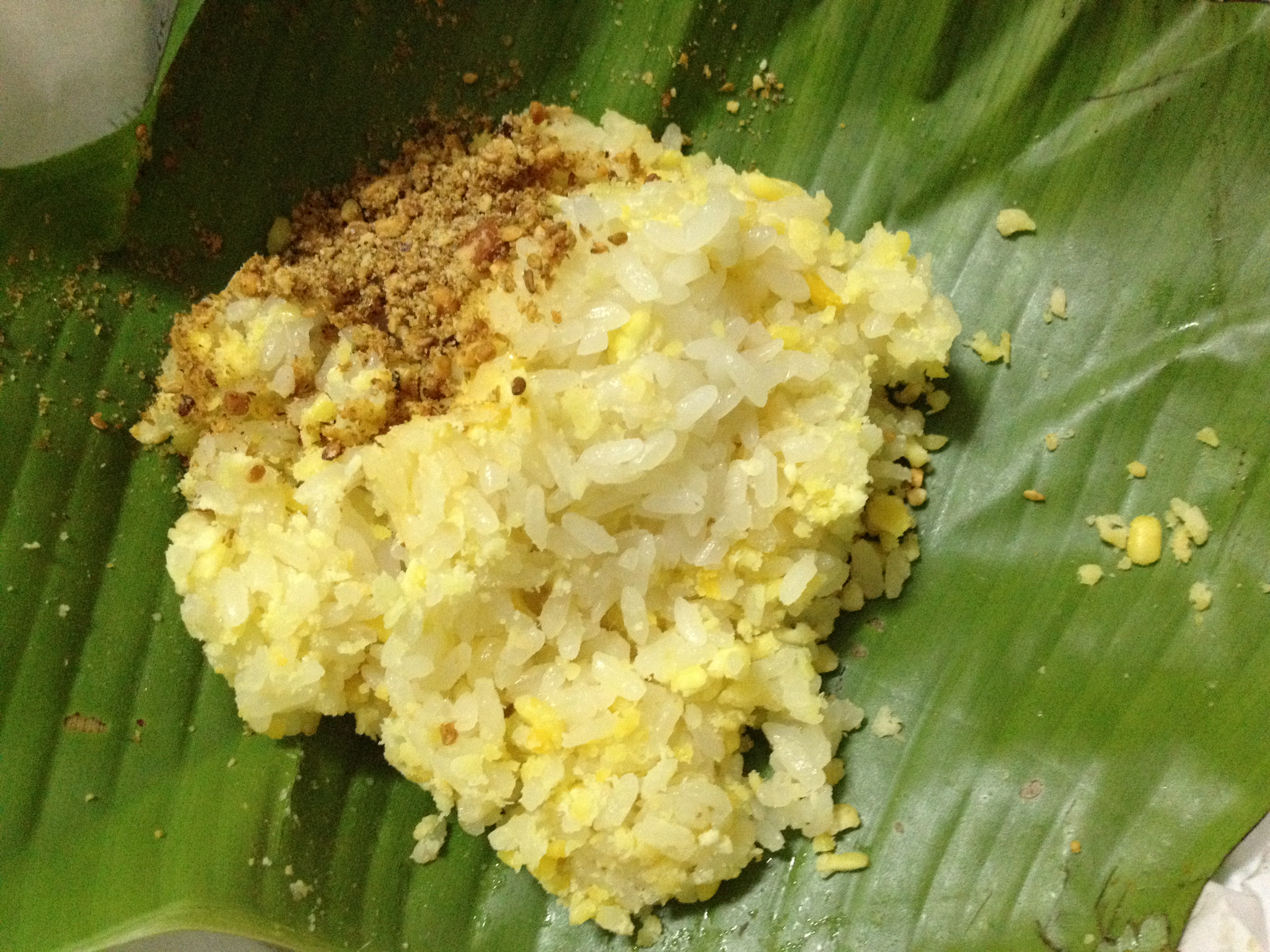
Xôi with mung beans (Xôi đậu xanh)

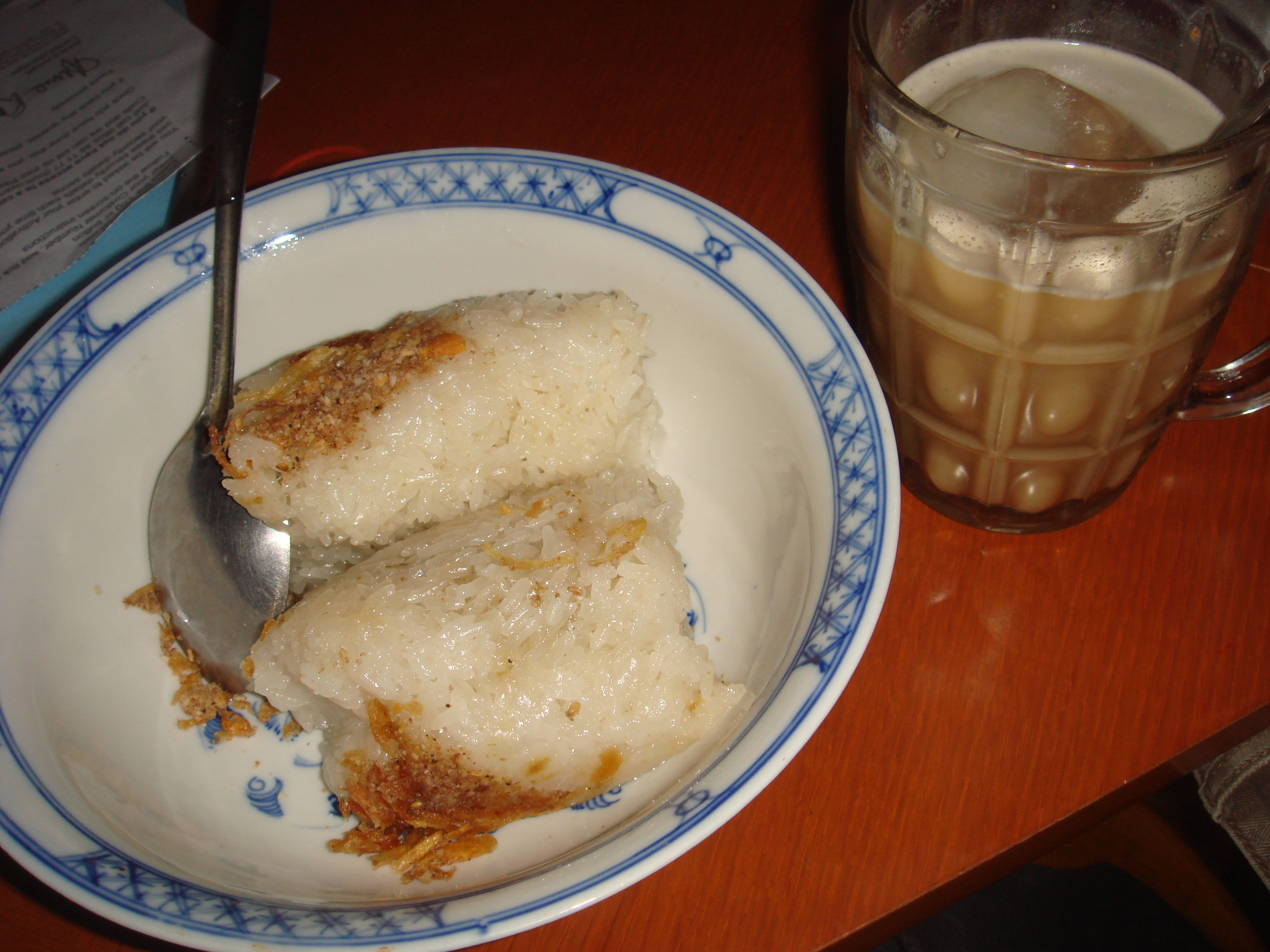
Xôi with yellow beans (Xôi cúc)

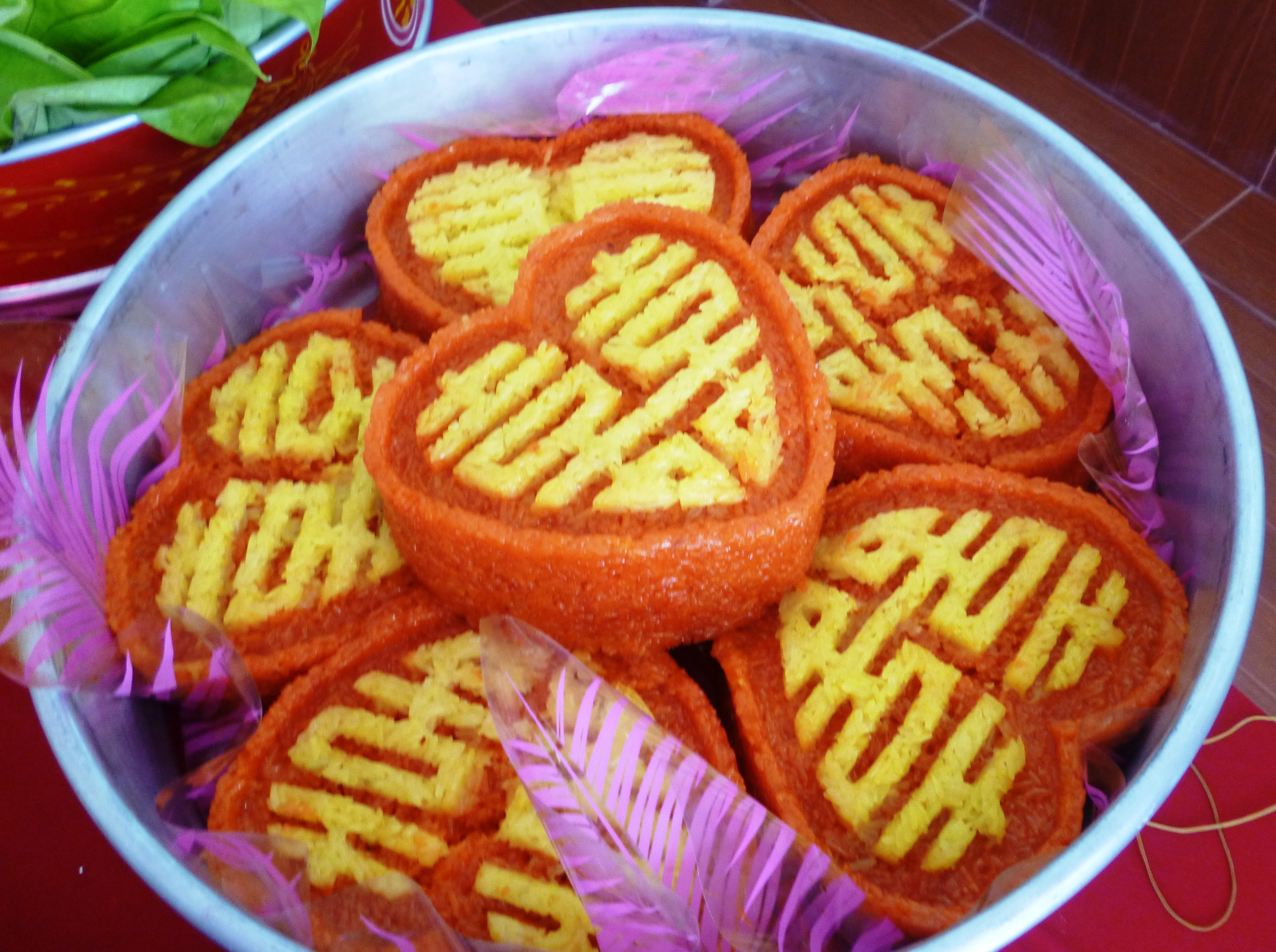
Xôi made with gac fruits (Xôi gấc)

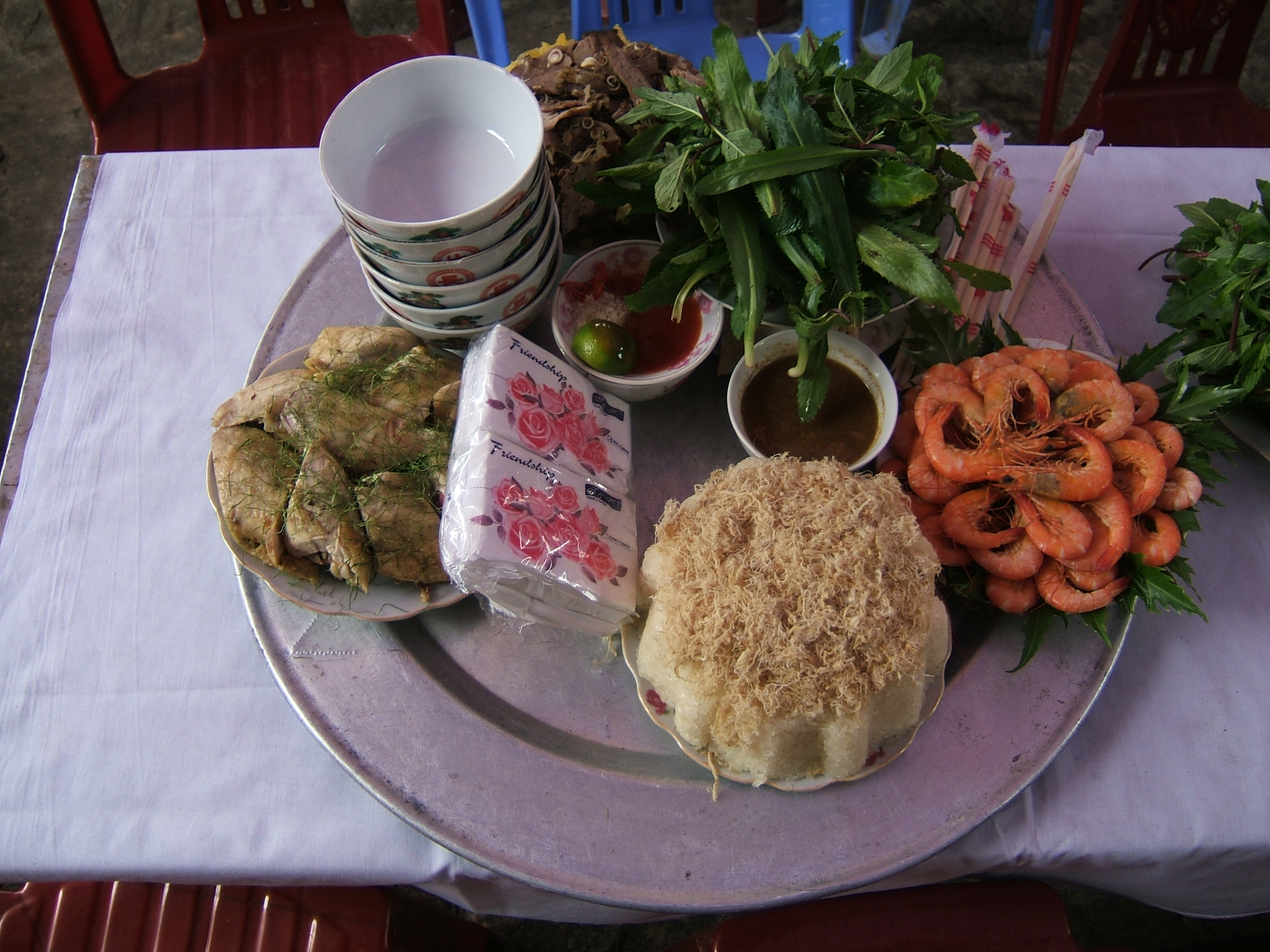
Xôi with meat fibers

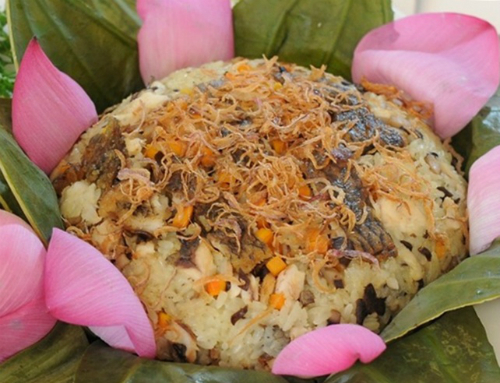
Xôi with perches (Xôi cá rô)

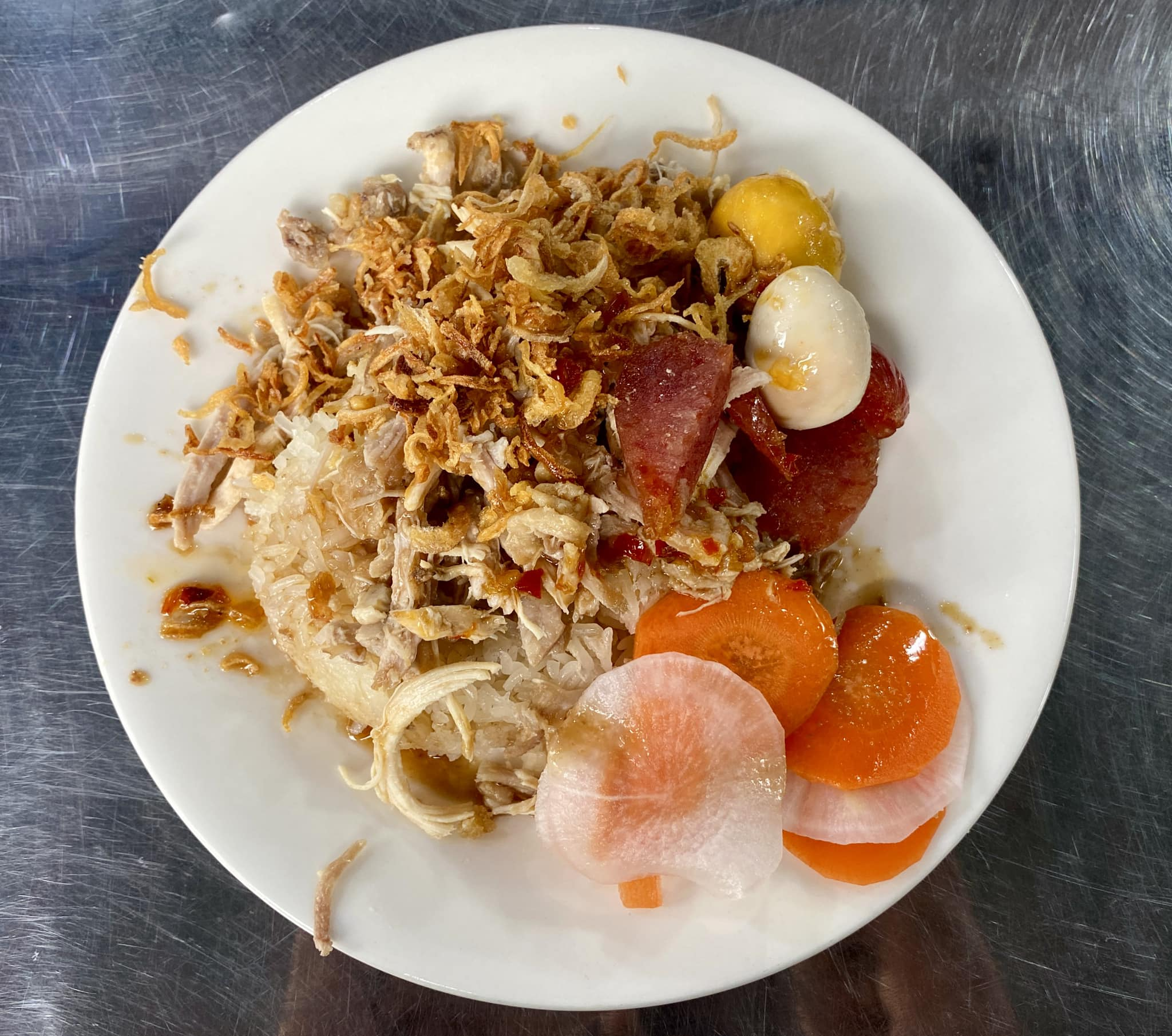
Xôi with chicken, eggs, and Chinese sausages (Xôi gà trứng non lạp xướng)

Subgum xôi (Xôi thập cẩm)

== See also ==
- Bánh chưng
- Bánh giầy
- Bánh đòn
- Bánh lá liễu (紅桃粿)
- Chả
- Chè
- Cơm
- Khao lam
- Lemang
- Mango sticky rice (Kao niew mamuang)
- Okowa (おこわ)
- Zhú tǒng fàn (竹筒飯)
