= Shang Trisumje =

Shang Trisumje is a Tibetan name. It may refer to:

- We Trisumje Tsangshar, the great minister of Tibetan Empire from 721 to 725.
- Dro Trisumje Taknang, the great minister of Tibetan Empire from 810 to 836.
