= Chimshang Gyalsig Shuteng =

General of the Tibetan Empire

Tibetan name
- Tibetan: མཆིམས་ཞང་རྒྱལ་ཟིགས་ཤུ་ཏེང
Transcriptions
- Wylie: mchims zhang rgyal zigs shu teng
- THL: chim zhang gyel zik shu teng

Chimshang Gyalsig Shuteng (Tibetan: མཆིམས་ཞང་རྒྱལ་ཟིགས་ཤུ་ཏེང, Wylie: mchims zhang rgyal zigs shu teng; ? – ?), also known as Shang Gyalsig, was a famous general of the Tibetan Empire. In Chinese records, his name was given as Shàng Jiéxī (simplified Chinese: 尚结息; traditional Chinese: 尚結息).

The king Me Agtsom was murdered by his two ministers, Lang Nyesig and Bel Dongtsab, in 755. Obtaining this information, Shang Gyalsig quickly put down the rebellion together with Nganlam Takdra Lukhong, arrested them and had them purged. They installed the young prince Trisong Detsen as the new king, and both received high positions.

Shang Gyalsig led 200,000 troops invaded Tang China together with another famous general Nganlam Takdra Lukhong, in 762, forcing Emperor Daizong of Tang to flee the capital. They sank Chang'an, the Chinese capital, installed a prince Li Chenghong (李承宏) as a puppet emperor, but had to withdraw after 15 days because the Tibetan soldiers could not stand the hot weather in Chang'an.

Political offices
Preceded by Gos Trisang Yalag	"Lönchen" of Tibet; 782?	Succeeded by Nganlam Takdra Lukhong
