= We Nangshar Sutsen =

Tibetan name
- Tibetan: དབའས་སྣང་བཞེར་ཟུ་བརྩན
Transcriptions
- Wylie: dba'as snang bzher zu btsan
- THL: waé nang zher zu tsen

We Nangshar Sutsen (Tibetan: དབའས་སྣང་བཞེར་ཟུ་བརྩན, ? – ?) was an officer of Tibetan Empire.

According to Old Tibetan Chronicle, Nangshar was appointed as the Lönchen by the new crown king Trisong Detsen after his predecessor's execution in 755. He was later succeeded by Gos Trisang Yalag.

Political offices
| Preceded by Bel Kyesang Dongtsab | "Lönchen" of Tibet; 755 – 768? | Succeeded by Gos Trisang Yalag |
