= Nge Mangsham Taktsab =

Tibetan name
- Tibetan: རྔེགས་མང་ཞམ་སྟག་ཚབ
Transcriptions
- Wylie: rngegs mang zham stag tshap
- THL: ngek mang zham tak tsap

Nge Mangsham Taktsab (Tibetan: རྔེགས་མང་ཞམ་སྟག་ཚབ, Wylie: rngegs mang zham stag tshap, died 727) was a general of Tibetan Empire.

According to Tibetan Annals, Mangsham was appointed as the Lönchen in 725 after Shang Trisumje's death. He was ordered to convene a spring coalition in 726, and levied taxes on people who were directly subordinate to the emperor. He died in the next year and succeeded by another general, We Tadra Khonglo.

Political offices
| Preceded by We Trisumje Tsangshar | "Lönchen" of Tibet; 725 – 727 | Succeeded by We Tadra Khonglo |
