= We Tadra Khonglo =

Tibetan name
- Tibetan: དབའས་སྟག་སྒྲ་ཁོང་ལོད
Transcriptions
- Wylie: dbavs stag sgra khong lod
- THL: waé ta dra khong lö

We Tadra Khonglo (Tibetan: དབའས་སྟག་སྒྲ་ཁོང་ལོད, Wylie: dbavs stag sgra khong lod; ? – 728), also known as We Tara Khonglo (Tibetan: དབས་ཏ་ར་ཁོང་ལོད), was a general of Tibetan Empire who served as Lönchen during the reign of Me Agtsom. In Chinese records, his name was given as Xīnuòluó Gōnglù (Chinese: 悉諾邏恭祿).

He invaded Tang China in 727, sank Guazhou (瓜州, in modern Gansu), Changle (常樂, in south of modern Guazhou County), Changmenjun (長門軍, in north of modern Yumen) and Anxi (安西, modern Lintan). Chinese generals saw him as the biggest threat in the Sino-Tibetan border.

According to the Tibetan Annals, Tadra Khonglo was executed by Me Agtsom in brag mar in 728. According to Old Book of Tang, a Chinese general named Xiao Song had spies create rumors in Tibet that Tadra Khonglo was conspiring with Tang—which Me Agtsom believed, and summoned him then had him killed.

Political offices
Preceded by Nge Mangsham Taktsab	"Lönchen" of Tibet; 727–728	Succeeded by Dro Chungsang Ormang
