= Dro Chungsang Ormang =

Tibetan name
- Tibetan: འབྲོ་ཅུང་བཟང་འོར་མང
Transcriptions
- Wylie: 'bro cung bzang 'or mang
- THL: dro chung zang or mang

Dro Chungsang Ormang (Tibetan: འབྲོ་ཅུང་བཟང་འོར་མང, Wylie: vbro cung bzang vor mang, ? – ?) was a general of Tibetan Empire who served as Lönchen during the reign of Me Agtsom.

According to the Tibetan Annals, Dro Chungsang succeeded as the Lönchen after We Tadra Khonglo's execution in 728. He was ordered to convene winter coalitions in 726, 729, 731, 732, 743 and 747; and convened a summer coalition in 742. He was ordered to collect food supplies on people in 730. 'A-zha launched a rebellion against Tibet in 735 and was put down by him in the next year. He was later succeeded by another general named Bel Kyesang Dongtsab.

Political offices
Preceded by We Tadra Khonglo	"Lönchen" of Tibet; 728 – 747?	Succeeded by Bel Kyesang Dongtsab
