= Potala Palace Inner Stele =

Monument to Celebrate the Finishing of the Potala Palace

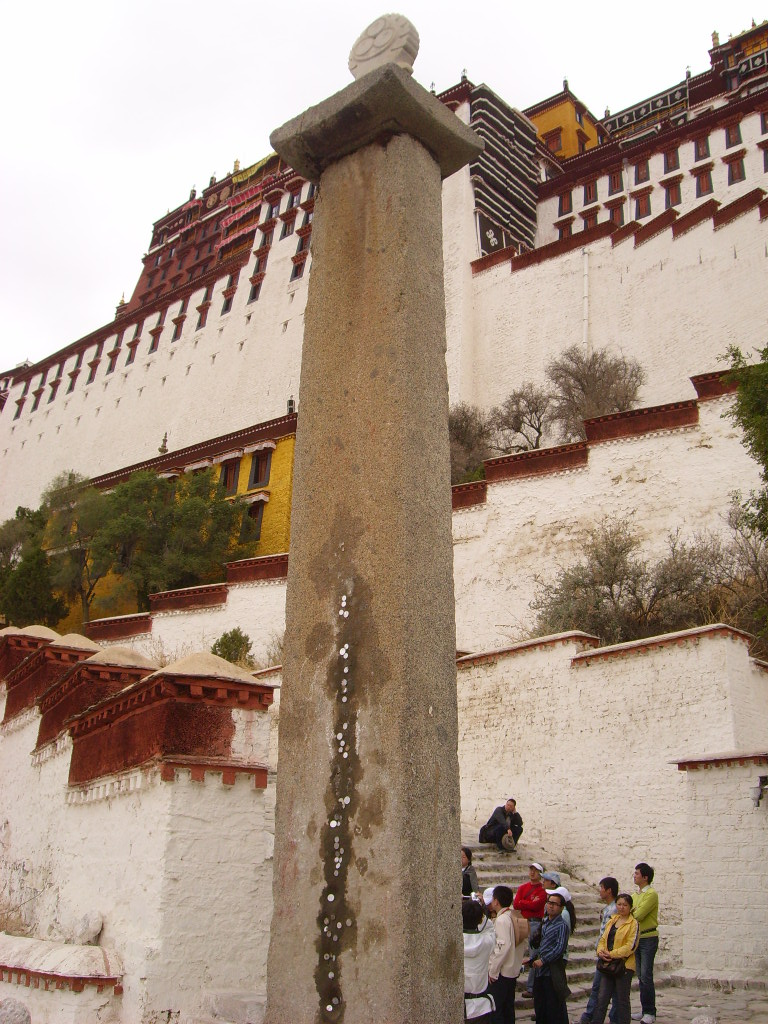
Potala Palace Inner Stele

Potala Palace Inner Stele (Tibetan: རྡོ་རིངས་ནང་མ་, Wylie: rdo-rings-nang-ma), or Unmarked Monument of Potala Palace (Chinese: 布达拉宫无字碑), is an unmarked stele in the Potala Palace in Lhasa, Tibet Autonomous Region.

== History ==
The monument is to commemorate the completion of the Red Palace of the Potala Palace. In 1690, construction of the Red Palace started and was completed in 1693. There was a grand inauguration ceremony for the Red Palace, and in front of the palace they set up an unmarked monument, called the "Inner Monument", in contrast with the Lhasa Zhol Pillar (Doring Chima) located outside the Palace.
