= Dranga Palkye Yongten =

Buddhist monk of Tibetan Empire

Dranga Palkye Yongten (Tibetan: བྲན་ཀ་དཔལ་གྱི་ཡོན་ཏན, Wylie: bran ka dpal kyi yon tan, ? – ?), also known as Dranga Yongten or Yongten, was a Buddhist monk of Tibetan Empire.

He served as Banchenpo (Wylie: ban chen po, "Monk Minister") during Ralpacan's reign. He was friendly to Tang China, and signed a peace treaty between Tibet and China after a long-term war. A Chinese mission came to Lhasa in 821, to meet with Tibetan high officers, and swore an oath of friendship between the two states. They erected three stone monuments in Chang'an, Lhasa and Sino-Tibetan border, with the full text of the treaty (both in Chinese and Tibetan) in it. The only remained pillar still stands outside the Jokhang temple in Lhasa today. According to the text, he was the highest minister of Tibet at that time.

Dranga came into conflict with the Lönchen Wagyel Toré because Toré had no actual power, and was hostile to Buddhism. Toré told Ralpacan that Yongten fornicated with the queen Pelkyi Ngangchul (see also Karmamudrā), made Ralpacan very angry. Yongten was so frightened, and fled from the capital. Toré captured him and had him flayed.
