= Khu Mangpoje Lhasung =

Tibetan name
- Tibetan: ཁུ་མང་པོ་རྗེ་ལྷ་ཟུང
Transcriptions
- Wylie: khu mang po rje lha zung
- THL: khu mang po jé lha zung

Khu Mangpoje Lhasung (Tibetan: ཁུ་མང་པོ་རྗེ་ལྷ་ཟུང, Wylie: khu mang po rje lha zung, ? – 705), also known as Khu Mangpoje, was a general of the Tibetan Empire. In Chinese records, his name was given as Qū Mǎngbùzhī (Chinese: 麴莽布支).

After Tridu Songtsen purged Gar clan, he was sent to the east border to defense against Tang China. It proved that he was a general did not have military talents and was lack of experience in the later days. He invaded Liangzhou and put Changsong (昌松, in modern Wuwei) under siege in 700, in order to vanquish Tibetan troops led by the traitor Gar Tsenba, but was utterly beaten by Chinese general Tang Xiujing. He lost his two adjutants in this battle.

Tridu Songtsen died in 704 in 'Jang (Nanzhao), and Nepal and Se rib revolted. Mongpoje was appointed as Lönchen to put down the rebellion, but he tried to overthrow the powerful empress regent Thrimalö. He was captured and executed, his position turned to another general named We Trisig Shangnyen. Thrimalö had his property confiscated in 707.

Political offices
Vacant Title last held by Gar Trinring Tsendro	"Lönchen" of Tibet; 704 – 705	Succeeded by We Trisig Shangnyen
