= We Gyaltore Taknye =

Lönchen of the Tibetan Empire

Tibetan name
- Tibetan: དབའས་རྒྱལ་ཏོ་རེ་སྟག་སྙ
Transcriptions
- Wylie: dba'as rgyal to re stag snya
- THL: Wégyel Toré Taknya

We Gyaltore Taknye (Tibetan: དབའས་རྒྱལ་ཏོ་རེ་སྟག་སྙ, Wylie: dba'as rgyal to re stag snya, "Dba'as clan noble leader Toré" ? – 842), also known as Wa Taknachen (Wylie: dba'as stag rna can "Tiger-Ear of the Dba'as clan), was the last Lönchen of the Tibetan Empire. In Chinese records, his name was given as Jié Dūnà (simplified Chinese: 结都那; traditional Chinese: 結都那).

He was appointed as Lönchen during Ralpacan's reign. Ralpacan indulged in Buddhism religion, leaving all his political affairs to the Banchenpo (Monk Minister) Dranga Palkye Yongten to deal with. Gyaltore had no actual power, and he was hostile to Buddhism. He told Ralpacan that Yongten fornicated with the queen (see also Karmamudrā), made Ralpacan very angry. Yongten was so frightened. He fled from the capital, but soon was captured and executed. After this, Gyaltore became the de facto ruler of Tibet. He murdered Ralpacan in the palace, in 838, and installed Langdarma as the new king.

According to traditional accounts, during the first two years of his rule, Langdarma remained a Buddhist, but under the influence of Gyaltore, the king became a follower of Bon. Many Buddhist monks or supporters were exiled or killed during this time; thousands of Buddhist temples were torn down and sacred texts were thrown into water.

Langdarma was assassinated by a Buddhist monk named Lhalung Pelgyi Dorje in 842. Langdarma had two sons: Tride Yumten by his first wife Nanamsa and Namde Ösung by his second wife. It was said that Tride Yumten was a fake prince, Nanamsa bought him from a beggar. Yumten was installed by Nanamsa, Gyaltore and many ministers refused to recognize him. Then, Gyaltore was captured and executed.

Civil war broke out between the two princes which eventually led to the Era of Fragmentation in Tibet.

In Tibetan Buddhist culture, He was said to be the incarnation of Preta with monkey head and tiger ears.

Political offices
Preceded by Dro Trisumje Taknang	Great Minister of the Tibetan Empire; 836? – 842	Title abolished
