= Dro Trisu Ramsha =

Tibetan general

Tibetan name
- Tibetan: འབྲོ་ཁྲི་གཟུ་རམ་ཤགྶ
Transcriptions
- Wylie: vbro khri gzu ram shags
- THL: dro tri zu ram shak

Dro Trisu Ramsha (Tibetan: འབྲོ་ཁྲི་གཟུ་རམ་ཤགྶ, ? – ?) was a general of the Tibetan Empire. He was a "Shang" (ཞང, imperial affine) of King of Tibet.

He conquered the Kingdom of Khotan in 790. After the death of Nanam Shang Gyaltsen Lhanang, he was appointed as Lönchen.

Political offices
Preceded by Nanam Shang Gyaltsen Lhanang	"Lönchen" of Tibet; 796 – 800?	Succeeded by We Mangje Lhalo
