= We Mangje Lhalo =

Tibetan name
- Tibetan: དབའ་མང་རྗེ་ལྷ་ལོད
Transcriptions
- Wylie: dbav mang rje lha lod
- THL: waé mang jé lha lö

We Mangje Lhalo (Tibetan: དབའ་མང་རྗེ་ལྷ་ལོད, Wylie: dbav mang rje lha lod) was a general of Tibetan Empire.

He invaded Tang China together with Dro Trisu Ramsha in 814. He was appointed as the Lönchen and later succeeded by another general Dro Trisumje Taknang.

Political offices
Preceded by Dro Trisu Ramsha	"Lönchen" of Tibet; 800? – 810?	Succeeded by Dro Trisumje Taknang
