= We Trisig Shangnyen =

Tibetan general

Tibetan name
- Tibetan: དབའས་ཁྲི་གཟིགས་ཞང་ཉེན
Transcriptions
- Wylie: dba's khri gzigs zhang nyen
- THL: wé tri zik zhang nyen

We Trisig Shangnyen (Tibetan: དབའས་ཁྲི་གཟིགས་ཞང་ཉེན, Wylie: dbavs khri gzigs zhang nyen, ? – 721), also known as Shang Trisig (ཞང་ཁྲི་གཟིགས), was a general of the Tibetan Empire. In Chinese records, his name was given as Qǐ Lìxú (Chinese: 乞力徐).

After Tridu Songtsen's death in 'Jang (Nanzhao), Tibet had to face many difficulties, including unstable political situation, vassal kingdom's rebellion, and military conflict with Tang China. Trisig was appointed as Lönchen after his predecessor Khu Mangpoje Lhasung's betrayal and execution in 705. It proved that he was an excellent assistant. With his help, the powerful empress regent Khri ma lod quickly put down the rebellion, and re-established the king's authority. His term also saw the royal marriage of Me Agtsom and the Chinese Princess Jincheng (金城公主).

He led 100,000 troops to invade Tang China together with 'bod da rgyal (འབོད་ད་རྒྱལ) in 714, but was defeated by Chinese general Xue Ne. He died in 721 together with two high ministers, Zhang btsan bar (ཞང་བཙན་བར) and Khri bzung sTag tsab (ཁྲི་བཟང་སྟག་ཙབ); perhaps they were killed in action.

Political offices
Preceded by Khu Mangpoje Lhasung	"Lönchen" of Tibet; 705 – 721	Succeeded by We Trisumje Tsangshar
