= Nganlam Takdra Lukhong =

8th century Tibetan general

Tibetan name
- Tibetan: ངན་ལམ་སྟག་སྒྲ་ཀླུ་ཁོང
Transcriptions
- Wylie: ngan lam stag sgra klu kong
- THL: ngen lam tak dra lu khong

Nganlam Takdra Lukhong (Tibetan: ངན་ལམ་སྟག་སྒྲ་ཀླུ་ཁོང་, Wylie: Ngan-lam sTag-sgra Klu-kong, ? – ?), also known as Nganlam Tara Lukhong (Tibetan: ངན་ལམ་རྟ་ར་ཀླུ་ཁོང་, Wylie: Ngan-lam rTa-ra Klu-kong), Nganlam Lukhong or Lon Takdra (Tibetan: བློན་སྟག་སྒྲ་, Wylie: bLon sTag-sgra), was a famous general of the Tibetan Empire who served as Lönchen during Trisong Detsen's reign. In many Chinese records, his name is given as Mǎ Chóngyīng (simplified Chinese: 马重英; traditional Chinese: 馬重英).

Takdra Lukhong was born in 'phan yul (modern Lhünzhub County, Lhasa, Tibet). He served as a general during Me Agtsom's reign. After the murder of Me Agtsom by his two ministers, Lang Nyesig and Bel Dongtsab in 755, Takdra Lukhong and Shang Gyalsig quickly put down the rebellion and had rebels purged. The young prince Trisong Detsen succeeded, Takdra Lukhong was appointed nang lön chen po ("Chief Inner Minister"), and became the second highest officials just below the regent Mashang Drompakye, both were followers of Bon and opponents of Buddhism.

Takdra Lukhong led 200,000 troops to invade Tang China together with Shang Gyalsig in 763. The Emperor Daizong of Tang had to flee to Shanzhou (modern Shanzhou District, Sanmenxia, Henan). They sacked Chang'an, which was the Chinese capital and one of the richest cities in the world at that time, and installed a prince Li Chenghong (李承宏) as a puppet emperor, but had to withdraw after 15 days because the Tibetan soldiers could not stand the hot weather in Chang'an. Trisong Detsen built a pillar below the Potala Palace to commemorate his merit. The pillar was known as "Lhasa Zhol Pillar", and to this day, it still stands there. In the inscription, Trisong Detsen placed Takdra Lukhong and his clan above the law and entitled them to some special privileges. Trisong Detsen promised that he would not kill Takdra Lukhong and his descendants even if they committed serious crimes.

Takdra Lukhong launched several campaigns to invade China over the next few years. In 765, he invaded China again and allied with Uyghur Khaganate. Many Chinese officials fled from Chang'an because they were very afraid of Tibetan troops. But later, Uyghurs broke their alliance and turned to China. Takdra Lukhong was defeated by Chinese-Uyghur allied forces led by Guo Ziyi and had to retreat.

Takdra Lukhong was a follower of Bon. Trisong Detsen decided to promote Buddhism when he was 20 years old but was strongly opposed by Takdra Lukhong, Mashang Drompakye, and even the queen Magyal Dongkar. Mashang predicted that if the emperor promoted Buddhism, all scriptures of Bon would be abandoned, the end of the world might be nigh and the empire would collapse. Mashang was murdered. Trisong Detsen hosted a famous debate between Buddhist and Bon supporters, and the winner would be recognised as the "state religion" in Tibet. Bon was supported by the queen and Takdra Lukhong, but finally, Trisong Detsen announced that Buddhism was the winner. Bon was declared an illegal religion, their scriptures were buried in the ground or thrown into the water. Takdra Lukhong refused to carry out this order, and was caned in public then exiled to Changtang. Later, Takdra Lukhong had to convert to Buddhism, and built a black pagoda in Samye as a place to offer Śarīra of Buddha. He regained the emperor's trust and later appointed gung lön chen po ("Chief Minister"), the highest official position in Tibet.

According to New Book of Tang, Takdra Lukhong invaded Tang China in 778. He led a troop advance to the north and completely defeated Uyghurs in Tian Shan. In this battle, Uyghurs lost their main force of the army, leading to their khaganate's decline. In 792, The whole East Turkestan was occupied by Tibet.

== See also ==
- Lhasa Zhol Pillar

Political offices
Preceded by Chimshang Gyalsig Shuteng	"Lönchen" of Tibet; 782? – 783	Succeeded by Nanam Shang Gyaltsen Lhanang
