= Bel Kyesang Dongtsab =

Tibetan name
- Tibetan: འབལ་སྐྱེས་ཟང་སྡོང་ཚབ
Transcriptions
- Wylie: vbal skyes zang ldong tshab
- THL: bel kyé zang dong tsap

Bel Kyesang Dongtsab (Tibetan: འབལ་སྐྱེས་ཟང་སྡོང་ཚབ, Wylie: vbal skyes zang ldong tshab; ? – 755), also known as Bel Dongtsab, was a general of the Tibetan Empire.

Bel Dongtsab invaded Bruzha (modern Gilgit in Pakistan) in 737 and conquered it. Later, he was appointed as the Lönchen by Me Agtsom.

Bel Dongtsab murdered Me Agtsom in 755, and launched a rebellion together with his colleague Lang Nyesig. They were supported by the Sumpa king Dro Tsen. Dongtsab was defeated by two famous generals, Chimshang Gyalsig Shuteng and Nganlam Takdra Lukhong, and was captured. He was executed together with Lang Nyesig and their family members.

Political offices
Preceded by Dro Chungsang Ormang	"Lönchen" of Tibet; 747? – 755	Succeeded by We Nangshar Sutsen
