= Dro Trisumje Taknang =

9th-century Tibetan military leader

Tibetan name
- Tibetan: འབྲོ་ཁྲི་སུམ་རྗེ་སྟག་སྣང
Transcriptions
- Wylie: vbro khri sum rje stag snang
- THL: dro tri sum jé tak nang

Dro Trisumje Taknang (Tibetan: འབྲོ་ཁྲི་སུམ་རྗེ་སྟག་སྣང, Wylie: vbro khri sum rje stag snang), also known as Shang Trisumje, was a 9th-century Tibetan military leader during the Tibetan Empire. In Chinese records, his name was given as Shàng Qǐxinīr (simplified Chinese: 尚绮心儿; traditional Chinese: 尚綺心兒).

== Early life ==
Trisumje was born into the Dro clan, an important Tibetan family based in Kokonor (modern-day Qinghai).

== Career ==
During the reign of Sadnalegs (c.800 - 815 AD), Trisumje was appointed a military leader within the Tibetan army. During this period, the Tibetan empire stretched as far west as Samarkand and Kabul and was coming into conflict with the Arabs of West Asia. Circa 800 AD, Trisumje defeated the Abbasid Caliphate and installed a Tibetan governor of Kabul, capturing the Abbasid troops and pressing them into service on the empire's eastern frontier. During the next fifteen years, Trisumje led an army to conquer a large area of Central Asia, culminating in the successful invasion of the Uyghur Khaganate in 815 AD. However, Trisumje was forced to retreat after failing to capture the Uyghur capital of Karabalghasun (modern-day Ordu-Baliq).

Sadnalegs died in 815 AD, and was succeeded by his son, Ralpacan, who kept Trisumje as his military leader. By 819 AD, Tibet was in conflict with Tang China. Trisumje led 150,000 troops to attack the Chinese city of Yanzhou, but was forced to retreat after 27 days due to strong resistance. In 821 AD, Chinese diplomats and Tibetan generals met in the Tibetan capital of Lhasa to sign a peace treaty between the two empires. Three stone monuments carved to commemorate the event list Trisumje as the second highest ministerial witness.

Political offices
Preceded by We Mangje Lhalo	"Lönchen" of Tibet; 800? – 836?	Succeeded by We Gyaltore Taknye
