= We Trisumje Tsangshar =

Tibetan name
- Tibetan: དབའས་ཁྲི་སུམ་རྗེ་རྩང་བཞར
Transcriptions
- Wylie: dba'as khri sum rje rtsang bzhar
- THL: waé tri sum jé tsang zhar

We Trisumje Tsangshar (Tibetan: དབའས་ཁྲི་སུམ་རྗེ་རྩང་བཞར, Wylie: dba'as khri sum rje rtsang bzhar, died 725), also known as Lon Trisumje or Shang Trisumje, was a general of Tibetan Empire.

According to Tibetan Annals, Trisumje convened winter coalitions of generals in 714, 715, 717, 719 and 720. After Shang Trisig's death in 721, he was appointed as Lönchen. Later, he convened summer coalitions from 722 to 725 (except the year 724); and winter coalitions from 721 to 724. He died in 725 and succeeded by Nge Mangsham Taktsab.

Political offices
Preceded by We Trisig Shangnyen	"Lönchen" of Tibet; 721 – 725	Succeeded by Nge Mangsham Taktsab
