= Gar Tsenye Dompu =

General of the Tibetan Empire (d. 685 CE)

Tibetan name
- Tibetan: མགར་བརྩན་སྙ་ལྡོམ་པུ
Transcriptions
- Wylie: mgar brtsan snya ldom pu
- THL: gar tsen nya dom pu

Gar Tsenye Dompu (Tibetan: མགར་བརྩན་སྙ་ལྡོམ་པུ, Wylie: mgar brtsan snya ldom pu; ? – 685) was a general of the Tibetan Empire. He was the eldest son of minister Gar Tongtsen Yülsung. In Chinese records, his name was given as Zàn Xīruò (simplified Chinese: 赞悉若; traditional Chinese: 贊悉若).

The Lönchen Gar Tongtsen died of neck cancer in 'A-zha in 667, leaving his position vacant. Though many officials regarded We Sungnang as the most suitable candidate, Mangsong Mangtsen still appointed Tsenye as the Lönchen.

Gar Tsenye raided the remaining Chinese territories in the Tarim Basin in 673. He came into conflict with another minister Gar Mangnyen Taktsab (མགར་མང་ཉེན་སྟག་ཙབ), then, met on the battleground in 685. He died by a river in Sumpa.

His brother Gar Trinring Tsendro quickly put down the rebellion then had Mangnyen Taktsab purged. Later, Trinring was appointed as the new Lönchen.

Political offices
Preceded by Shanglon Tromo (acting)	"Lönchen" of Tibet; 667 – 685	Succeeded by Gar Trinring Tsendro
