= Lhasa Zhol Pillar =

Stone pillar in Lhasa, Tibet

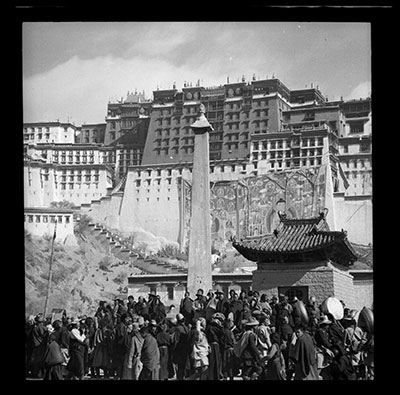
The Potala adorned with two Buddhist silk banners, Koku (gos sku), for the Sertreng ceremony with the Zhol outer pillar in the foreground in 1949.

The Zhol outer pillar, or Doring Chima, is a stone pillar which stands outside the historical residential and administrative Zhol village below the Potala Palace, in Lhasa, Tibet. It was erected to commemorate a 783 border treaty between the Tibetan Empire and the Tang dynasty. The pillar is inscribed with an old example of Tibetan writing.

== Erection ==
The pillar was erected during the reign of King Trisong Detsen (755 until 797), the 38th king of the Yarlung dynasty. It was commissioned by Chisong Dezan who erected a monument to commemorate the war achievements of Nganlam Takdra Lukhong.

== The inscription ==
The creation of the Tibetan script occurred during the reign of Songsten Gampo, the 33rd king of the Yarlung dynasty, through the work of Thonmi Sambhota and others. Sambhota was sent to India early in Songsten Gampo's reign, and devised an alphabet suitable for the Tibetan language by adapting elements of Indian scripts and other scripts.

The inscription starts off by announcing that Nganlam Takdra Lukhong had been appointed Great Inner Minister and Great Yo-gal 'chos-pa (a title difficult to translate). It goes on to say that Klu-khong brought to Trisong Detsen the facts of the murder of his father, Me Agtsom (704-754) by two of his Great Ministers, 'Bal Ldong-tsab and LangMyes-zigs, and that they intended to harm him also. They were then condemned and Klu-kong was appointed Inner Minister of the Royal Council.

It then gives an account of his services to the king including campaigns against Tang China which culminated in the brief capture of the Chinese capital Chang'an (modern Xi'an) in 763 CE during which the Tibetans temporarily installed as Emperor a relative of Princess Jincheng Gongzhu (Kim-sheng Kong co), the Chinese wife of Trisong Detsen's father, Me Agtsom.

It is a testament to the generally tolerant attitude of Tibetan culture that this proud memorial by a subject was allowed to stand after the re-establishment of Buddhism under Trisong Detsen and has survived until modern times.

== Other information about the pillar ==
Traditionally among the celebrations for Tibetan New Year, or Losar, a team of sportsmen, usually from Shigatse, would perform daredevil feats such as sliding down a rope from the top of the highest roof of the Potala, to the Zhol Pillar at the foot of the hill. However, the 13th Dalai Lama banned this performance because it was dangerous and sometimes even fatal.

As of 1993 the pillar was fenced off so it could not be approached closely (see accompanying photo).

== Gallery ==
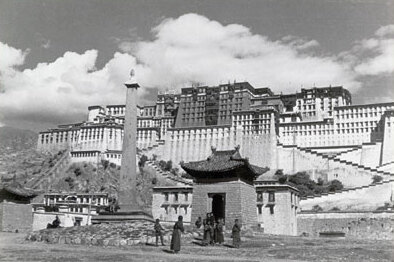
1936-1937

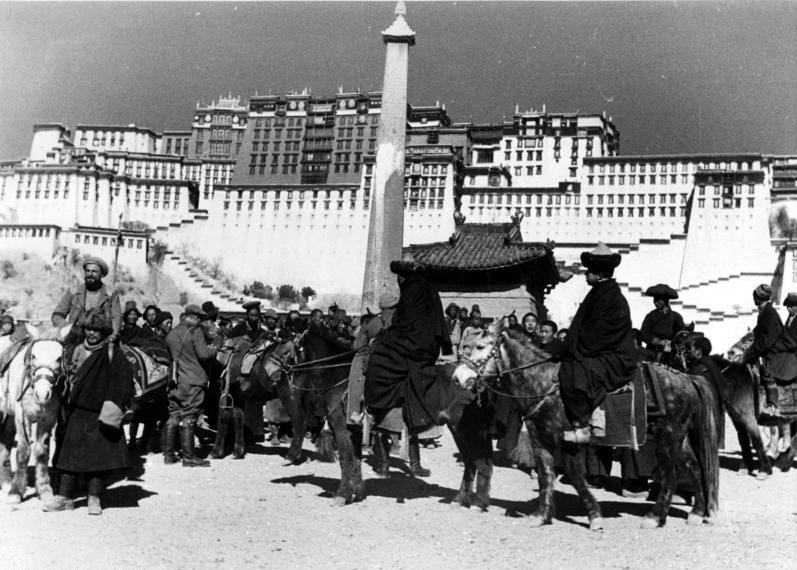
1938

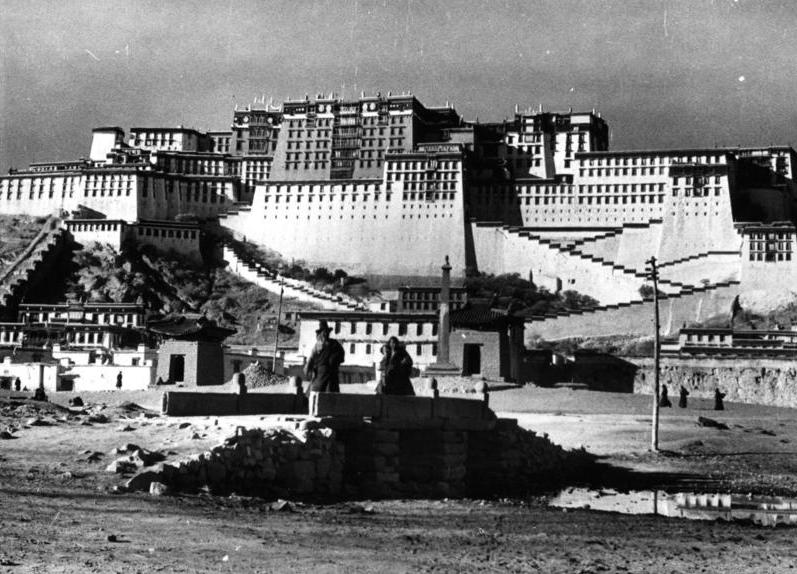
1938

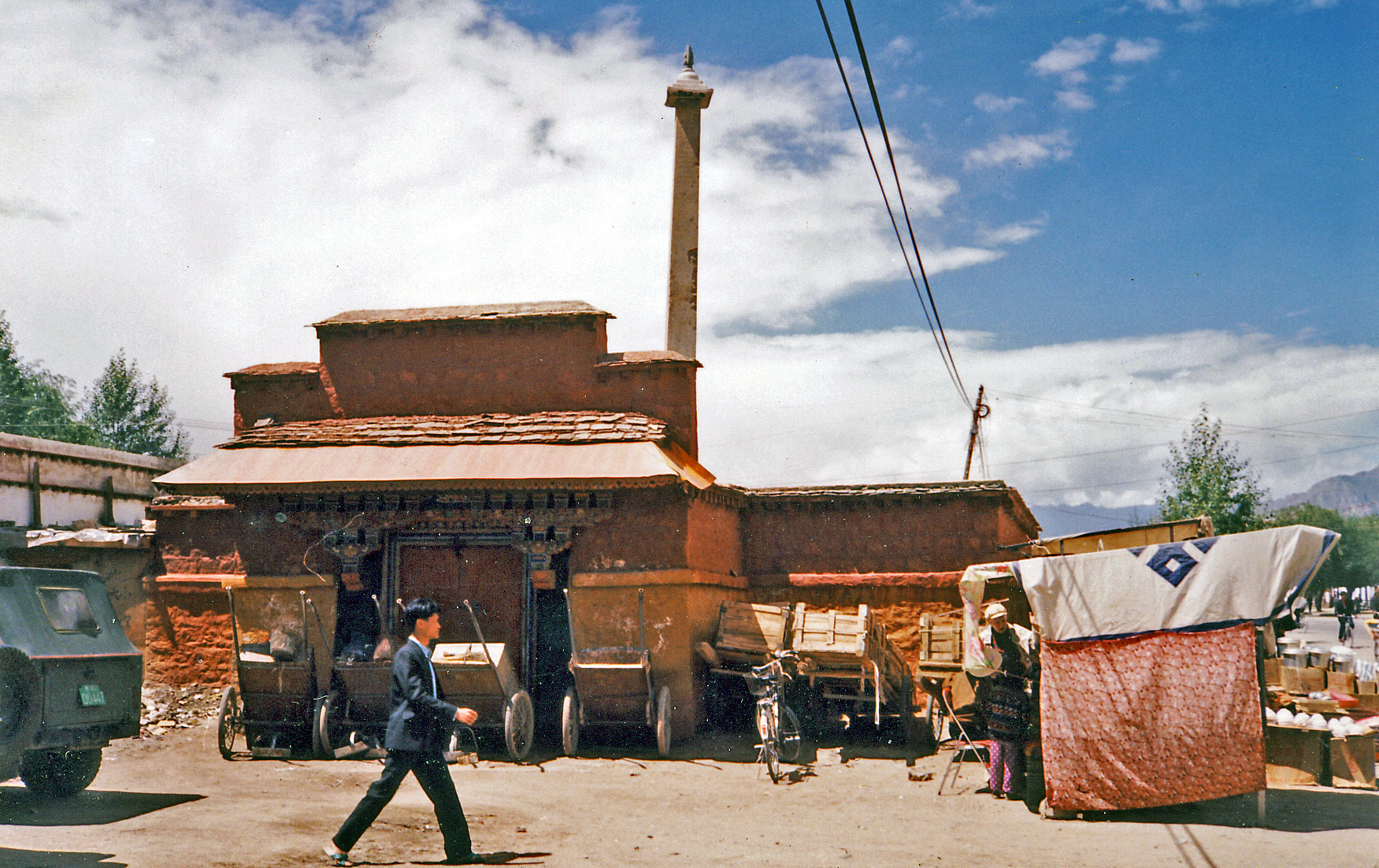
1993

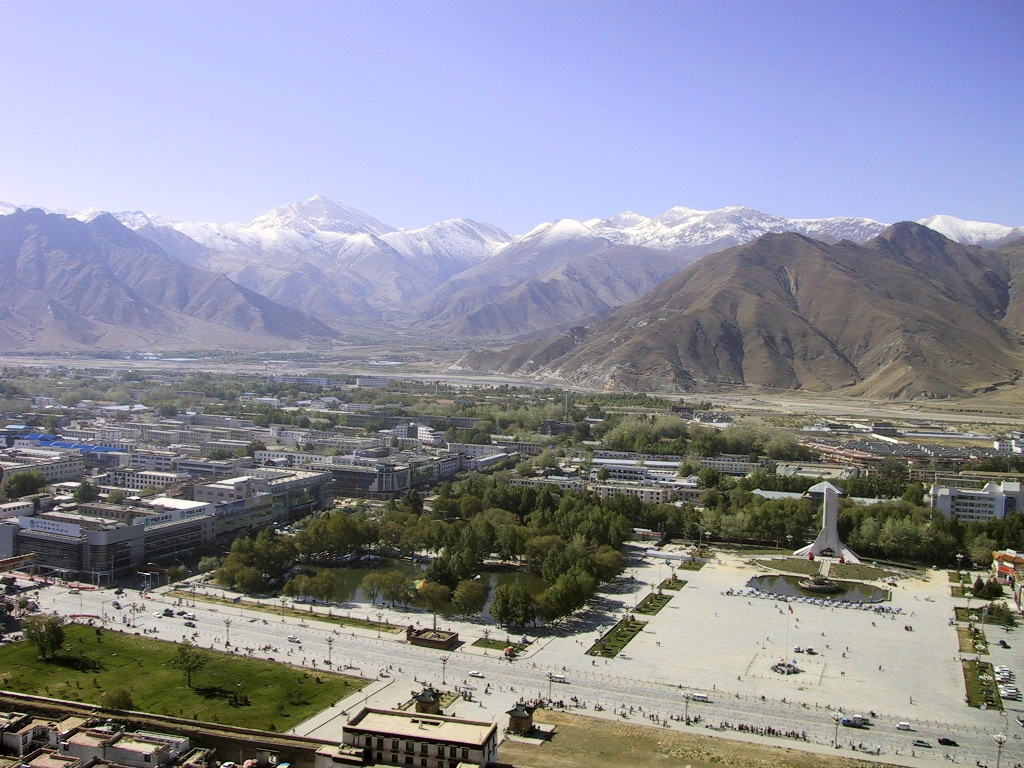
2004
