= Pelkyi Ngangchul =

Empress consort of the Tibetan Empire

Pelkyi Ngangchul (Tibetan: དཔལ་གྱི་ངང་ཚུལ; died 836) was an empress consort of the Tibetan Empire, married to emperor Ralpacan (r. 815–836).

She was a member of the Chogro (ཅོག་རོ་) clan. The anti Buddhist opposition at court successfully accused the emperors advisor, the Buddhist monk Drenka Pelkyi Yonten, for having been the lover of empress Pelkyi Ngangchul. This resulted in the execution of Drenka Pelkyi Yonten, and of the empress committing suicide. Her death resulted in her family conspiring against the emperor, which lead to his death.
