= Gar Trinring Tsendro =

Famous general of the Tibetan Empire

Tibetan name
- Tibetan: མགར་ཁྲིང་འབྲིང་བཙན་བྲོད
Transcriptions
- Wylie: mgar khri vbring btsan brod
- THL: gar tring dring tsen drö

Gar Trinring Tsendro (Tibetan: མགར་ཁྲིང་འབྲིང་བཙན་བྲོད, Wylie: mgar khri vbring btsan brod; ? – 699), also known as Lon Trinling (Tibetan: བློན་ཁྲི་འབྲིང), was a famous general of the Tibetan Empire. He was the second son of minister Gar Tongtsen Yülsung. In Chinese records, his name was given as Lùn Qīnlíng (simplified Chinese: 论钦陵; traditional Chinese: 論欽陵) or Qǐzhèng (Chinese: 起政).

== Career ==
After his elder brother Tsenye Dompu succeeded the Lönchen, he was sent to the newly conquered Azha. In the spring of 670, Tibet attacked the remaining Chinese territories in the western Tarim Basin. The Chinese general Xue Rengui with 50 thousand soldiers returned to Azha, and fought Trinring's 400 thousand soldiers by the Dafei River. The Tibetan Empire suffered huge loses as a result of this battle.

Gar Tsenye Dompu came into conflict with another minister Gar Mangnyen Taktsab (མགར་མང་ཉེན་སྟག་ཙབ), then, met on the battleground in 685. Tsenye died by a river in Sumpa. Obtaining this information, Trinring quickly put down the rebellion. Mangnyen Taktsab disappeared after this event, maybe was purged. Thrimalö, who was the de facto ruler at that time, appointed him as the new Lönchen.

China had to negotiate with Tibet, but could not reach a consensus because China wanted Tibet leave Azha while Tibet wanted China leave the Tarim Basin.

Trinring owned very high reputation in Tibet, which led ultimately to his ruin. The young king, Tridu Songtsen, realised that members of the Gar family had become independent warlords and posed a threat to the central authority of the king. In 699, the king pretended to organise a great hunt and then had his men turn on members of the Gar and their supporters, Then personally marched north and confronted Trinring. Trinring tried to resist, but his armies betrayed him, he had to commit suicide.

Gar family were purged in this coup d'état. His son Mangpoje (known as Lun Gongren (論弓仁) by Chinese) fled to China together with one of his brothers, Gar Tsenba (མགར་བཙན་པ).

Political offices
Preceded by Gar Tsenye Dompu	"Lönchen" of Tibet; 685 – 699	Vacant Title next held by Khu Mangpoje Lhasung
