= Mashang Drompakye =

Tibetan name
- Tibetan: མ་ཞང་གྲོམ་པ་སྐྱེས
Transcriptions
- Wylie: ma zhang grom pa skyes

Mazang Drompa Kye (Tibetan: མ་ཞང་གྲོམ་པ་སྐྱེས; 8th century) was a prime minister for King Trisong Detsen during the Tibetan Empire period.

After the young prince Trisong Detsen was enthroned, Mazang Trompa Kye served as a prime minister and regent. According to A Scholar's Feast, he was a follower of Bon and an opponent of Buddhism. During his regency period, Buddhism was banned, and art forms depicting the Buddha known as Buddharupa were buried in the ground or sent to mang yul (modern day Bhutan).

Trisong Detsen had converted to Buddhism secretly when he was 20 years old, but he was wary of his minister Mazang Trompa Kye. Later, the minister was murdered by Go Pema Gungtsen, who was the religious minister and confidant of the young king that was finally able to promote Buddhism in Tibet.
