= Gos Trisang Yalag =

Tibetan name
- Tibetan: མགོས་ཁྲི་བཟང་ཡབ་ལག
Transcriptions
- Wylie: mgos khri bzang yab lag
- THL: gö tri zang yap lak

Minister Go Trizang Yalag (Tibetan: མགོས་ཁྲི་བཟང་ཡབ་ལག; 8th century) known as Go Pema Gungtsen of the Go family was a minister of religion for Trisong Detsen during the Tibetan Empire.

He was a "Zang" (ཞང, imperial line) of the Tibetan king, trusted by Trisong Detsen and a Buddhist. With his help, Trisong Detsen removed the minister Mazang Trompa Kye, and exiled the minister Nganlam Takdra Lukhong to Changtang.

Buddhism was then recognised as Tibet's state religion. Bon supporters were forced to convert to Buddhism. Their cannons were buried or thrown into the water.

Trisong Detsen then was able to host a two-year debate from 792-794 CE in Tibet, known as the Samye Debate in modern scholarship, between the Chinese and Indian Buddhist traditions and their possible roles in Tibetan Buddhism. Trisong Detsen supported Kamalaśīla, an Indian Buddhist, against Chan Buddhist Moheyan. Eventually, Kamalaśīla won the debate, and Moheyan was driven out of Tibet.
