= List of Lönchen of the Tibetan Empire =

Tibetan Empire had nine high ministers in court. The highest one was gung lön chen po (གུང་བློན་ཆེན་པོ, lön chen (བློན་ཆེན) for short), which could be translated into English as "Chief Minister" or "Prime minister".

The first Lönchen was appointed during Detrul Namshungtsen's reign. It was abolished before the Era of Fragmentation.

Here is a complete list of Lönchen according to The Old Tibetan Chronicle (P.T. 1287).

Name	Tibetan script	Term of office	Note
Dar Tongdangje	འདའར་སྟོང་དང་རྗེས་	during Detrul Namshungtsen's reign	
Nge Dukyije	རྔེགས་དུད་ཀྱི་རྗེས་		
Ku Lhawo Gogar	ཁུ་ལྷ་བོ་མགོ་གར་		
Lho Tangtring Yateng	ལྷོ་ཐང་འབྲིང་ཡ་སྟེངས་		
Nge Tanga Yongtangje	རྔེགས་ཐ་ང་ཡོང་ཐང་རྗེས་		
Nup Montore Bungtsen	གནུབས་སྨོན་ཏོ་རེ་སྦུང་བརྩན་		
Thonmyi Tringpo Gyaltsennu	མཐོན་མྱི་འབྲིང་པོ་རྒྱལ་བཙན་ནུས་	during Namri Songtsen's reign	Plot rebellion, captured and executed
Nanam Tringtokje	སྣ་ནམ་འབྲིང་ཏོག་རྗེས་		
Nup Tritore Tongpo	གནུབས་ཁྲི་དོ་རེ་མཐོང་པོས་		
Nup Tritokje Tsuglon	གནུབས་ཁྲི་དོག་རྗེ་གཙུག་བློན་		
Nup Nyentore Ngannang	གནུབས་མཉེན་ཏོ་རེ་ངན་སྣང་		
Shupu Gyaltore Nganyi	ཤུད་པུ་རྒྱལ་ཏོ་རེ་ང་མྱིས་		
Mong Tritore Nangtsab	མོང་ཁྲི་དོ་རེ་སྣང་ཚབ་		
Gar Tridra Zimun	མགར་ཁྲི་སྒྲ་འཛི་རྨུན་		
Nyang Mangpoje Shangnang	མྱང་མང་བོ་རྗེ་ཞང་སྣང་	during Songtsen Gampo's reign	Plot rebellion, forced to commit suicide
Gar Mangsham Sumnang	མགར་མང་ཞམ་སུམ་སྣང་	during Songtsen Gampo's reign	
Khyungpo Pungse Sutse	ཁྱུང་པོ་སྤུང་སད་ཟུ་ཙེས་	during Songtsen Gampo's reign	Plot rebellion, forced to commit suicide
Gar Tongtsen Yülsung	མགར་སྟོང་བྩན་ཡུལ་ཟུང་	652—659	
Omade Lotsen	འོ་མ་ལྡེ་ལོད་བཙན	659—661	Plot rebellion, captured and executed
Gar Tongtsen Yülsung	མགར་སྟོང་བྩན་ཡུལ་ཟུང་	661—667	
Shanglon Tromo	ཞང་ལོན་པྲ་མོ་	667	acting
Gar Tsenye Dompu	མགར་བཙན་སྙ་ལྡོམ་བུ	667—685	
Gar Trinring Tsendro	མགར་ཁྲི་འབྲིང་བཙན་བྲོད་	685—698	Plot rebellion, forced to commit suicide
vacant
Khu Mangpoje Lhasung	ཁུ་མང་པོ་རྗེ་ལྷ་ཟུང	705	Plot rebellion, captured and executed
We Trisig Shangnyen	དབའས་ཁྲི་གཟིགས་ཞང་ཉེན	705—721	
We Trisumje Tsangshar	དབའས་ཁྲི་སུམ་རྗེ་རྩང་བཞེར	721—725	
Nge Mangsham Taktsab	རྔེགས་མང་ཞམ་སྟག་ཚབ་	725—727	
We Tadra Khonglo	དབའས་སྟག་སྒྲ་ཁོང་ལོད	727—728	executed
Dro Chungsang Ormang	འབྲོ་ཅུང་བཟང་འོར་མང	728—747?	
Bel Kyesang Dongtsab	འབལ་སྐྱེས་ཟང་སྡོང་ཚབ	747?—754?	he murdered Me Agtsom, and was captured and executed
We Nangshar Sutsen	དབའས་སྣང་བཞེར་ཟུ་བརྩན	757—763	
Gos Trisang Yalag	མགོས་ཁྲི་བཟང་ཡབ་ལག	768—782?	
Chimshang Gyalsig Shuteng	མཆིམས་ཞང་རྒྱལ་ཟིགས་ཤུ་ཏེང	782?	
Nganlam Takdra Lukhong	ངན་ལམ་སྟག་སྒྲ་ཀླུ་ཁོང་	782?—783	
Nanam Shang Gyaltsen Lhanang	སྣ་ནམ་ཞང་རྒྱལ་ཚན་ལྷ་སྣང	783—796	
Dro Trisu Ramsha	འབྲོ་ཁྲི་གཟུ་རམ་ཤགྶ	796—800	
We Mangje Lhalo	དབའས་མང་རྗེ་ལྷ་ལོད	800—810	
Dro Trisumje Taknang	འབྲོ་སུམ་རྗེ་སྟག་སྣང	810—836	
We Gyaltore Taknye	དབའས་རྒྱལ་ཏོ་རེ་སྟག་སྙས	836—842	executed

== See also ==
- List of emperors of Tibet
- Banchenpo (Chief Monk)
- Sikyong
- Kashag
