= Zhol Village =

Village in Lhasa, Tibet, China

Coordinates: 29.657917°N 91.117167°E

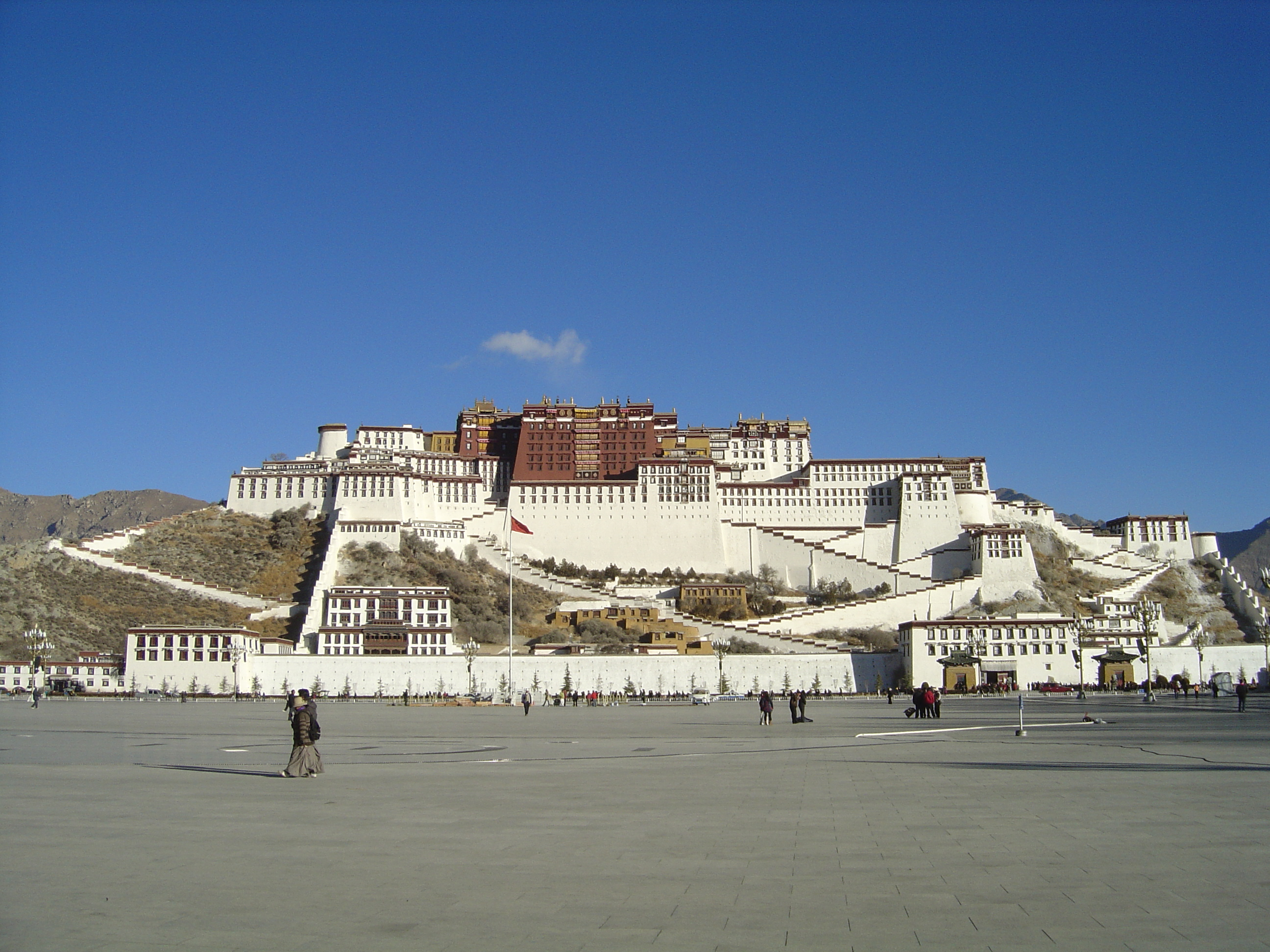
The Potala in 2008 with the towers and walls of Zhol beneath but without the outer Zhol, razed in 1995.

Zhol Village, or Shol Village (Chinese: 雪城; often transcribed as Zhöl or Shöl Village), is a village at the base of the Potala Palace in Lhasa, Tibet. It contained the residences and administrative buildings of Ganden Phodrang's government officials and other Tibetans. It was a favorite haunt of the 6th Dalai Lama. Two stone pillars are found around or in the village: the outer pillar, which is located outside the southern entrance and bears the oldest inscriptions in Tibetan, and the inner pillar, which stands beneath stairs leading to the Potala and has no inscription.

== Name ==
Zhol means 'below' in Tibetan, and refers particularly to a village or town right below a mountaintop castle.

== Layout and buildings ==
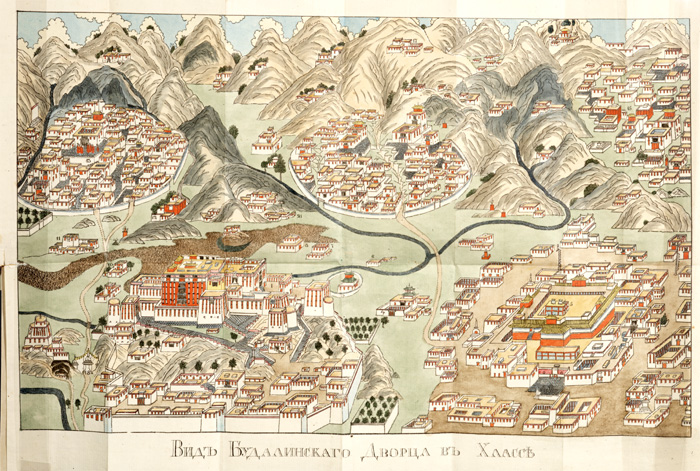
Map of Lhassa by Nikita Bichurin (first half of the 19th century). The village of Zhol with its walls and towers can be seen in the lower left corner.

The village of Zhol is located below the southern face of the Potala Palace. Rectangular in plan, it is surrounded by a wall on three sides, the fourth being occupied by the base of the hill where the palace stands. In the middle of each of the three sides, there is an entrance building: the main entrance, eastern entrance and western entrance. Historically, the village within the walls was called "inner Zhol" as opposed to a sliver of houses that lay beneath the south wall and was called "outer Zhol".

The buildings within the walls once included the residences of lay and religious dignitaries as well as the government offices, the Lhasa city's administration, the magistrates' court, the city prison, the bureau of revenue, the mint or treasure hall, the Western and Eastern printing houses, the stables, the dairies and the granary.

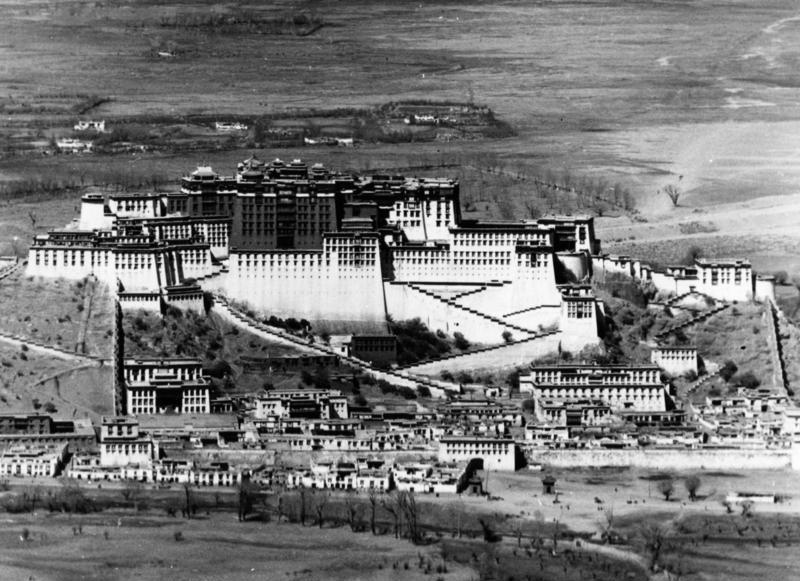
The Potala Palace in 1938 with the inner and outer parts of Zhol village in the lower foreground.

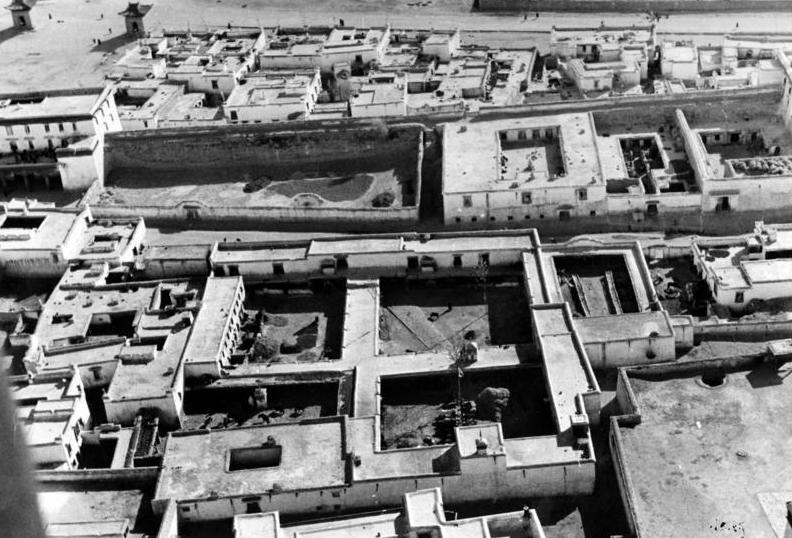
Inner Zhol was the sliver of low houses lying outside the western part of the south wall.

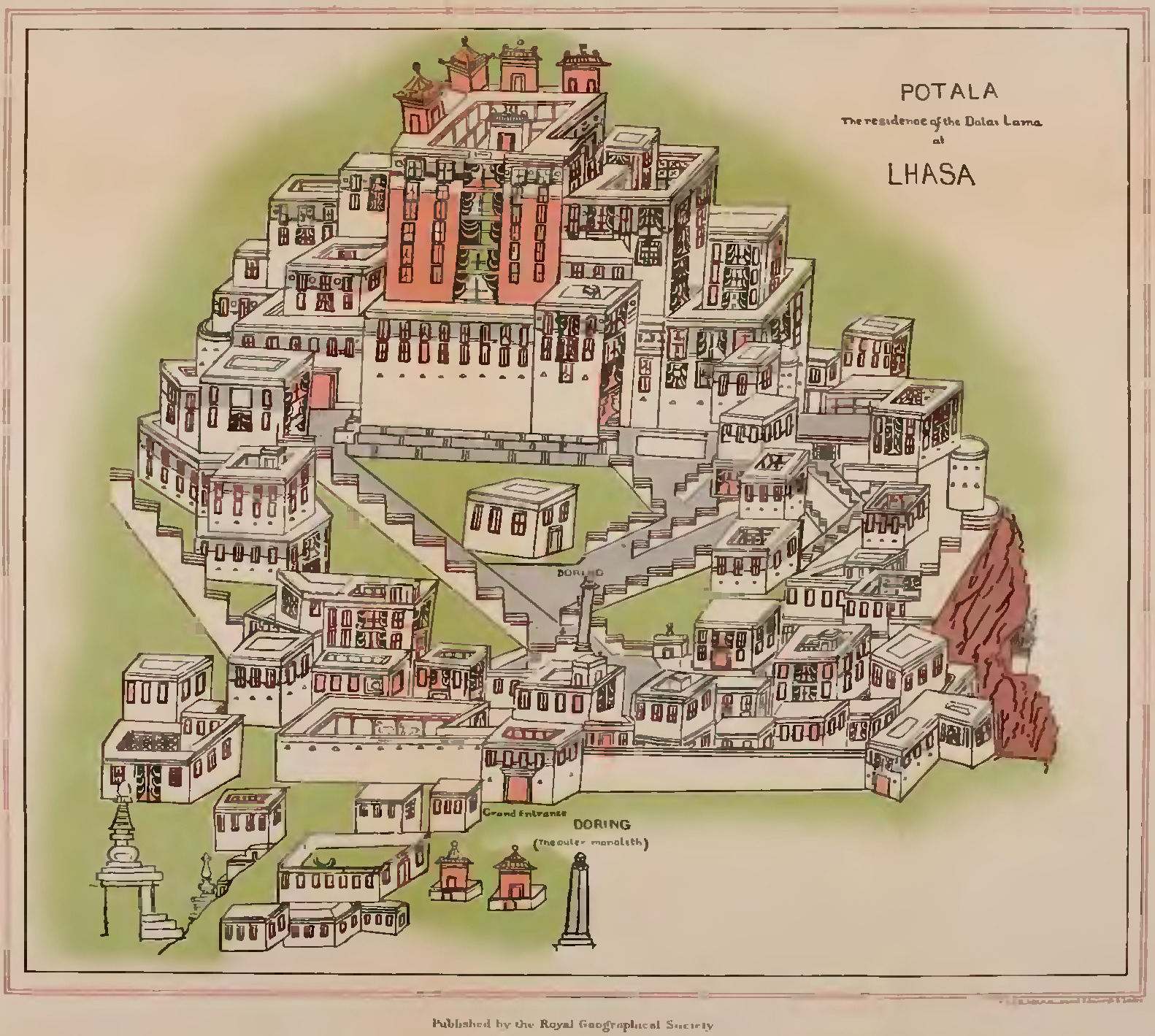
The outer and inner monoliths as drawn by Sarat Chandra Das in 1902.

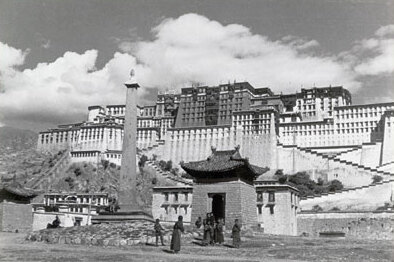
The Potala in 1936 with the village of Zhol at its base and the outer pillar outside the southern entrance.

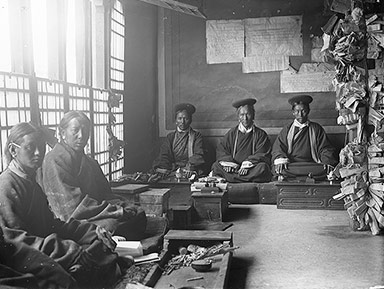
The police court. The magistrates are in overcoats and caps, with their clerks. Court records are fastened to walls and pillars.

== The "historic ensemble Potala and Zhol" ==
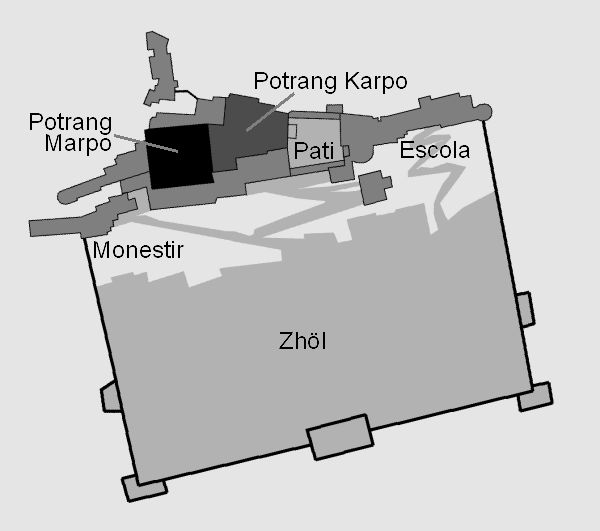
Layout of the Potala palace and the inner Zhol village.

In the summer of 1995, the families residing in the village were evicted from their homes and resettled to the North of Lhasa. A number of buildings that were not deemed part of the monument at the time were demolished in the inner Shol while the additions comprising the outer Zhol were razed.

In 2002, the Zhol area was taken over by the Management Office of the Potala Palace under a special Conservation and Improvement Project. Plans were made to convert the area into an Exhibition Complex of Tibetan Folk Arts and accommodate only those activities which were compatible with the functioning of the Potala Palace.

Renamed as Zhol City, the area presently covers 50,000 sq m. of the Potala Palace complex. In 2007, along with a tourist centre twelve renovated buildings (out of the existing twenty-two) were officially opened for visitors. These were the Spe Zhi residence, Mkham Zur residence, Lungshar residence, the five courts, the treasure hall, the printing shops, the tavern, the prison, the Las Khong building, the stables, the dairies and an art school.

In the restored tavern, which was a favorite haunt of the 6th Dalai Lama, Tsangyang Gyatso, visitors can witness the preparation, distillation, transportation and consumption of chang, the barley beer.

The mint displays a reproduction of a machine for making coins and banknotes and the evolution of the Tibetan currency until 1959.

== The doring chima and doring nangma ==
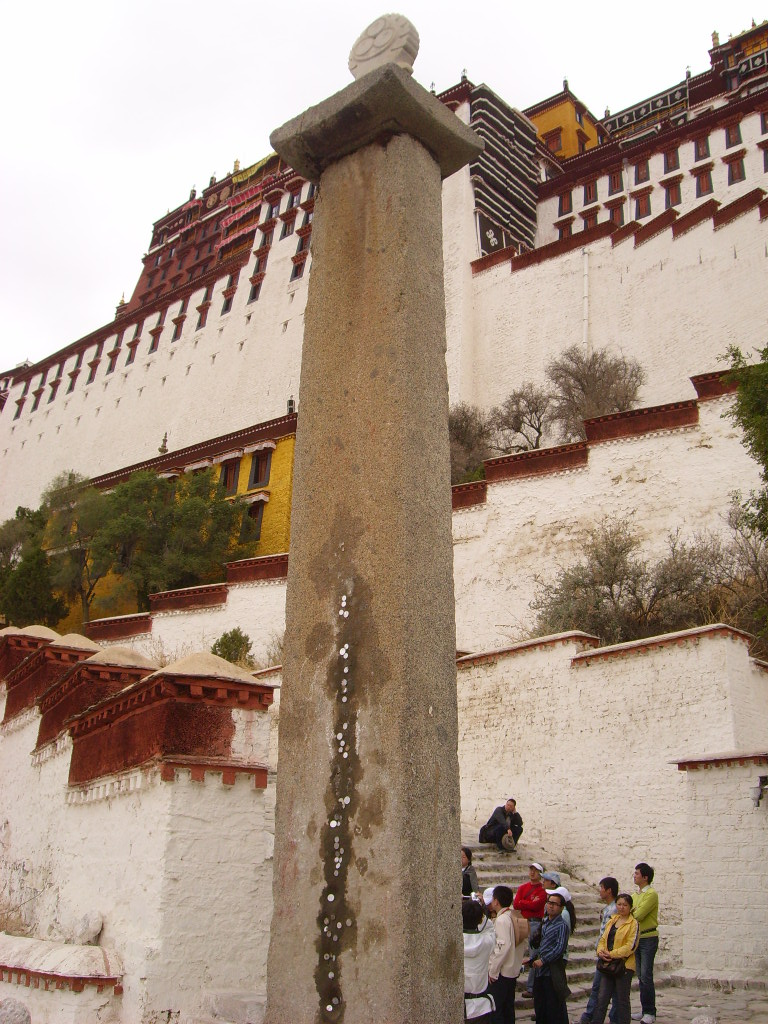
The inner pillar on the northern border of the village beneath the Potala stairs.

Two stone pillars are mentioned in connection with the village of Zhol.

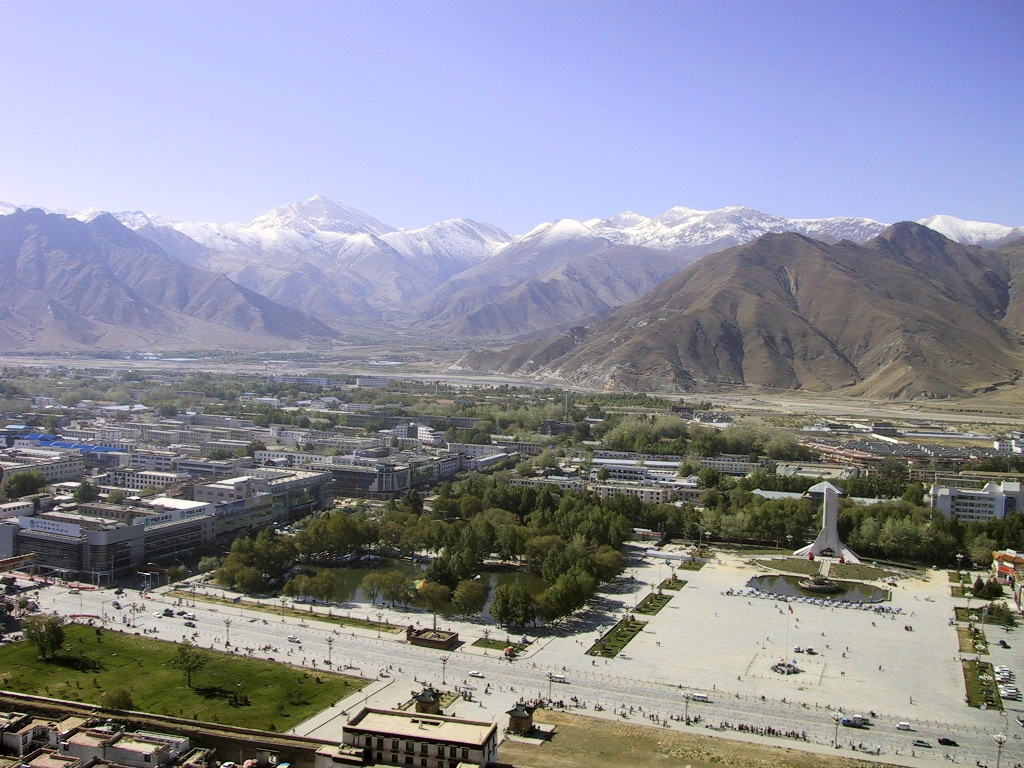
The view from the Potala. The outer pillar stands in a small enclosure on the far side of Beijing Road.

One is the doring chima ("outer stone pillar"), which is located outside the southern entrance of the village (on the far side of Beijing Road). Erected around 764 or "shortly after", the outer pillar bears the oldest inscriptions in Tibetan to date. They record Tibetan campaigns against China, culminating in the brief capture of the Chinese capital of Chang'an, now Xi'an, in 763.

The second pillar is the doring nangma ("inner stone pillar"), which stands on the northern border of the village, right beneath stairs leading to the Potala Palace. The inner pillar has no inscription.

== Bibliography ==
- Alexander, André (2002). "Zhol Village and a Mural Painting in the Potala: Observations Concerning Tibetan Architecture." Tibet Journal. Winter 2002, Vol. 27 Issue 3/4, p111, 12pp.
- Ancient Tibet: Research Materials from the Yeshe De Project. (1986). Dharma Publishing. Berkeley, California. ISBN 0-89800-146-3.
- Beckwith, Christopher I. (1987). The Tibetan Empire in Central Asia. Princeton University Press. Princeton, New Jersey. ISBN 0-691-02469-3.
- Larsen and Sinding-Larsen (2001). The Lhasa Atlas: Traditional Tibetan Architecture and Landscape, Knud Larsen and Amund Sinding-Larsen. Shambhala Books, Boston. ISBN 1-57062-867-X.
- Richardson, Hugh E. (1984) Tibet & Its History. 1st edition 1962. Second Edition, Revised and Updated. Shambhala Publications. Boston ISBN 0-87773-376-7.
- Richardson, Hugh E. (1985). A Corpus of Early Tibetan Inscriptions. Royal Asiatic Society. ISBN 0-947593-00-4.
- Snellgrove, David & Hugh Richardson. (1995). A Cultural History of Tibet. 1st edition 1968. 1995 edition with new material. Shambhala. Boston & London. ISBN 1-57062-102-0.
