= Li Chenghong =

Chinese imperial prince of the Tang dynasty

- Reign: November 18, 763 – November 30, 763
Full name
- Family name: Lǐ (李); Given name: Chénghóng (承宏)
- Dynasty: Tang (唐)

Li Chenghong (李承宏), commonly known as the Prince of Guangwu (廣武王), was an imperial prince of the Chinese Tang dynasty who was briefly declared emperor in 763 by invading Tibetan forces after they had captured the Tang capital Chang'an.

== Background ==
It is not known when Li Chenghong was born. He was the oldest son of Li Shouli the Prince of Bin, the second son of Li Xian, one time crown prince under Li Xian's father Emperor Gaozong. Early in the Kaiyuan (713–741) era of Li Shouli's cousin Emperor Xuanzong, Li Chenghong was created the Prince of Guangwu, and he did not succeed to the greater title of Prince of Bin upon his father's death in 741, suggesting that he was not born of Li Shouli's wife. (The title of Prince of Bin went to his younger brother Li Chengning (李承寧).)

Li Chenghong had at one point been given the honorary title of Mishu Jian (秘書監), the director of the Palace Library—but as the title was honorary, he did not actually run the archival bureau. At one point, he was accused of improper associations with people and was demoted to be the secretary general to the prefect of Fang Prefecture (房州, in modern Shiyan, Hubei), but was later recalled to the capital Chang'an and given the honorary title of minister of imperial clan affairs (宗正卿), but did not actually run the ministry of imperial clan affairs.

== Brief declaration as emperor ==
In 763, when Emperor Xuanzong's grandson Emperor Daizong was emperor, Tibet launched an attack against Chang'an, and Emperor Daizong was forced to flee to Shan Prefecture (陝州, in modern Sanmenxia, Henan). On November 18, 763, Tibetan forces entered Chang'an. A Tibetan general who defected from Tang, Gao Hui (高暉), and the Tibetan general Nganlam Takdra Lukhong (aka Ma Chongying, 馬重英) jointly declared Li Chenghong emperor, commissioning over 100 people as imperial officials, including the imperial scholars Yu Kefeng (于可封) and Huo Gui (霍瓌) as chancellors. Tibetan forces, however, were unable to force the chancellor Miao Jinqing, who was unable to flee Chang'an due to illness, to cooperate with Li Chenghong's regime. Soon, with the Tang general Guo Ziyi mounting a resistance movement, Tibetan forces pillaged the city and departed on November 30, 763. Li Chenghong hid in the wilderness but was recaptured by Guo's forces. Emperor Daizong issued a pardon for him but exiled him to Hua Prefecture (華州, in modern Weinan, Shaanxi). He died in Hua Prefecture shortly after.

== Notes and references ==
- Old Book of Tang, vol. 86.
- New Book of Tang, vol. 81.
- Zizhi Tongjian, vol. 223.
