= Sadnalegs =

6th Emperor of the Tibetan Empire and 39th King of Tibet (766–815)

Tridé Songtsen ཁྲི་ལྡེ་སྲོང་བཙན
- Tsenpo

King of Tibet
- Reign: 800 – 815
- Predecessor: Muné Tsenpo
- Successor: Tritsuk Detsen
- Born: c. 766
- Died: 815 (aged 49)
- Burial: Gyelchen Trülri Mausoleum, Valley of the Kings
- Spouse: Droza Lhagyel Mangmojé
- Issue: Tsangma; Ralpachen; Darma; Lhare Lhundrub; Tri Chenpo
Regnal name
- Tridé Tsenpo (ཁྲི་ལྡེ་སྲོང་བ)
- Lönchen: list We Mangje Lhalo; Dro Trisumje Taknang
- Banchenpo: Nyang Tingngezin Sangpo
- Dynasty: Yarlung
- Father: Trisong Detsen
- Mother: Magyal Dongkar
- Religion: Tibetan Buddhism

Tridé Songtsen (Tibetan: ཁྲི་ལྡེ་སྲོང་བ, Wylie: Khri lde srong ba), nicknamed Sadnalegs (Tibetan: སད་ན་ལེགས, Wylie: sad na legs), was the 39th King (Tsenpo) of Tibet from 800 to 815. He was the third and youngest son of Trisong Detsen. He reigned between the disputed king, Muné Tsenpo, and the 40th king, Ralpachen, making the dates of his reign from 800 to 815.

After Trisong Detsen retired to live at Zungkar, he passed the throne to his second son, Muné Tsenpo, who reigned from 797 to 799. It is said that Muné Tsenpo was poisoned by his mother.

Buton Rinchen Drub states that Muné Tsenpo's throne was passed to his brother Mutik Tsenpo, who was later "known by the surname of Sen-na-le (fn. 1351, Sadnalegs)."

Both the Chronicle of Ba, other Tibetan sources, and the Old Book of Tang agree that since Muné Tsenpo had no heirs, the throne passed to his younger brother, Mutik Tsenpo (Sadnalegs) in 800, and he was crowned by 804 CE.

Although Mutik Tsenpo was only four years of age, after the poisoning of Muné Tsenpo, the Buddhist monk Nyang Tingngezin proposed to enthrone Mutik Tsenpo as the king. He was so young that most of the ministers doubted his ability to be the king. In order to test the majesty of the young prince, the ministers let him sit on a seat and put many precious ornaments on his head. His body couldn't carry such a weight, so he tilted his neck and wobbled, which was considered very dignified. Finally he inherited the throne. Sadnalegs was assisted by four experienced ministers, two of whom were also Buddhist monks. They followed the policies of the previous kings. Sadnalegs had four wives from different Tibetan clans and five sons while the number of his daughters is unknown.

== Support for Buddhism ==
Indian scholars were invited to Samye Monastery to help translate Buddhist texts. Sadnalegs had the temple of Skar-cung (Karchung) built near Lhasa. Due to opposition to Buddhism, the king called a meeting with delegates and vassals from all over the kingdom and drew up a document pledging support for Buddhism which was signed by all who attended. An inscribed pillar with an account of this pledge was erected in front of the Karchung which still exists and has been translated into English.

In 816, he also standardized the literary Tibetan language used in translating the Buddhist scriptures from India, resulting in its transformation into Classical Tibetan.

== Political and military activities ==
Although Tibetan forces were fighting the Chinese between 799 and 803, with battles in Yanzhou (鹽州, present day Yanchi County, Ningxia), Lingzhou (麟州, Zoigê County, Sichuan), Weizhou (維州, Li County, Sichuan), Yazhou (雅州, Ya'an, Sichuan) and Suizhou (巂州, Xichang, Sichuan), envoys began travelling regularly from 804 onwards between Lhasa and Chang'an, although no formal treaty was signed. When Emperor Dezong died in 805, Ralpacan sent gifts of gold, silver, cloth, oxen and horses for the funeral.

The Tibetan army continued to attack the Arabs to the west and, according to al-Ya'qubi, they besieged Samarkand, the capital of Transoxiana at the time. Finally, the Tibetan governor of Turkestan presented a statue made of gold and precious stones to the Arab Caliph al-Ma'mun (r. 813–833). This statue was later sent to the Ka'ba in Mecca.

== Death and succession ==
Sadnalegs probably died in 815 (though the Blue Annals give 814). He had five sons, the first became a monk, the last two died in childhood. When Sadnaleg died, Langdarma was bypassed as he was anti-Buddhist and hot tempered and the royal power was given to Ralpacan.

An impressive stone pillar with an inscription commemorating Sadnalegs stand in the burial ground of the Tibetan kings near 'Phyong-rgas. It is partially illegible but confirms a number of historical events. It is of importance in dating Sadnalegs' reign as it states that warfare with China began when he took power. The Tang Annals report that the Chinese and Tibetans were fighting continuously between 799 and 803 CE, so it seems likely that Sadnalegs came to the throne c. 800–804 CE.

Regnal titles
Preceded by Mutik Tsenpo	Emperor of Tibet c. 800/804–815	Succeeded by Ralpacan
