= Qonggyai County =

Qonggyai County 琼结县 Chongye
- County
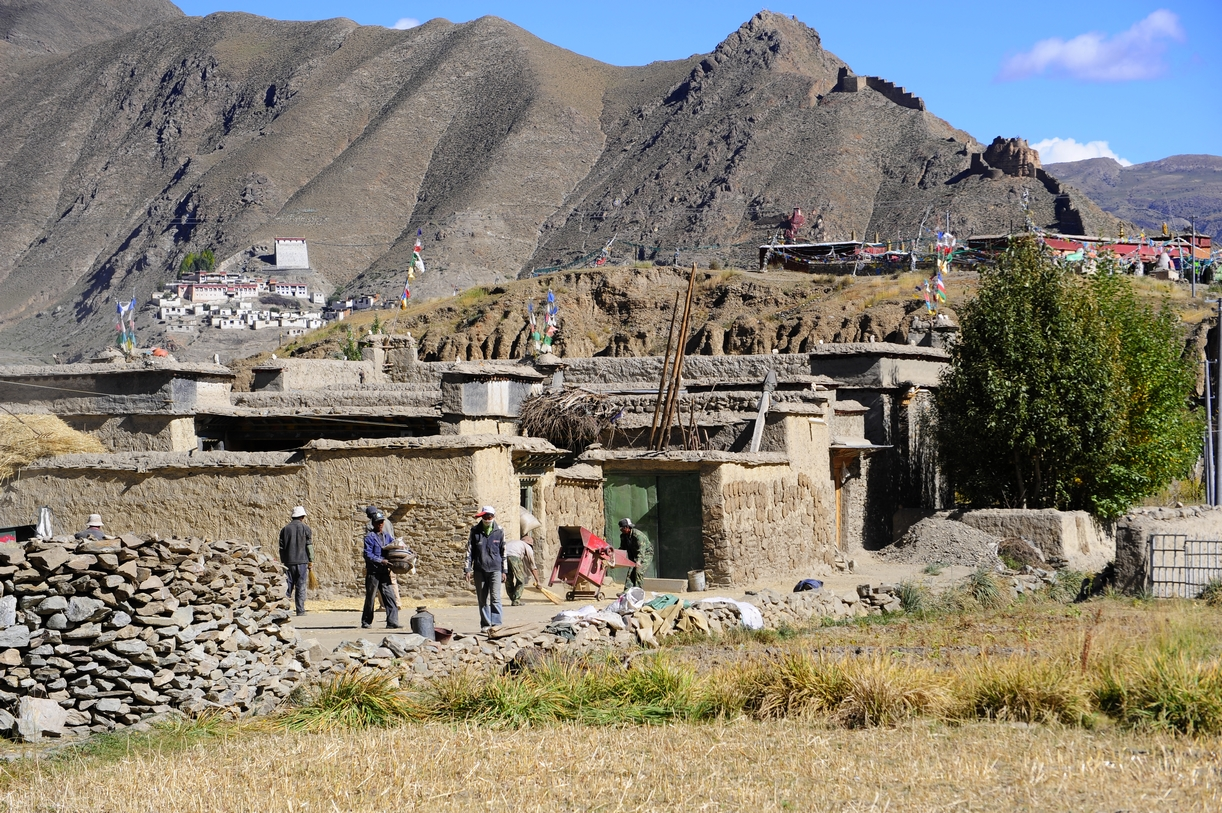
- Near the Valley of the Kings

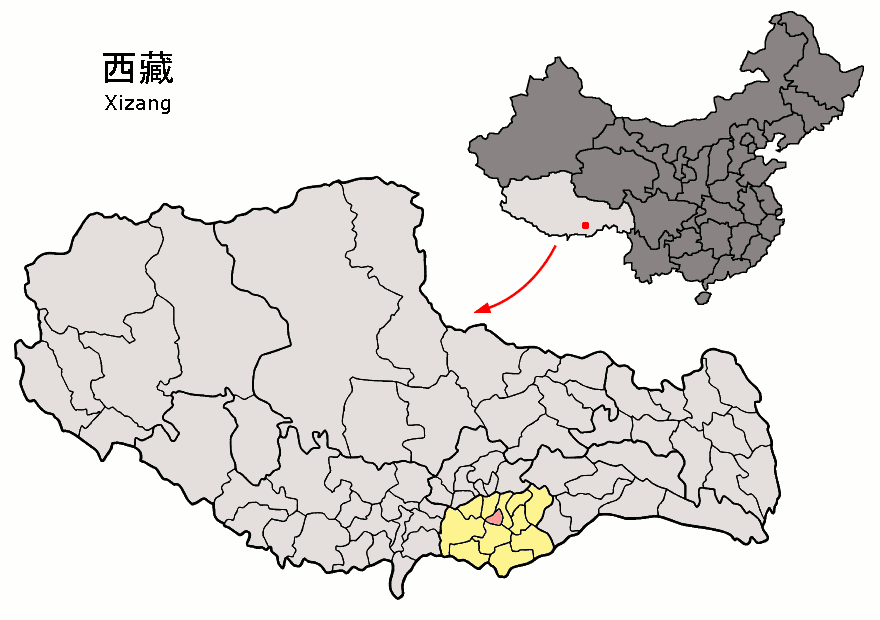
- Location of Qonggyai County (red) and Shannan City (yellow) within Tibet Autonomous Region

- Location of the seat in Tibet Autonomous Region Qonggyai (China)
- Coordinates: 29°15′30″N 91°51′30″E
- Country: China
- Autonomous region: Tibet
- Prefecture-level city: Shannan (Lhoka)
- County seat: Qonggyai

Area
  - Total: 1,030 km^{2} (400 sq mi)

Population (2020)
  - Total: 15,199
  - Density: 14.8/km^{2} (38.2/sq mi)
- Time zone: UTC+8 (China Standard)
- Website: www.qiongjie.gov.cn

Qonggyai County

Chinese name
- Simplified Chinese: 琼结县
- Traditional Chinese: 瓊結縣
Transcriptions
Standard Mandarin
- Hanyu Pinyin: Qióngjié Xiàn

Tibetan name
- Tibetan: འཕྱོངས་རྒྱས་རྫོང་།
Transcriptions
- Wylie: 'phyongs rgyas rdzong
- THL: Chonggyé dzong
- Tibetan Pinyin: Qonggyai Zong

Qonggyai County or Chongye (Tibetan: འཕྱོངས་རྒྱས་རྫོང, Chinese: 琼结县) is a county under jurisdiction of Shannan in the Tibet Autonomous Region, China.

== History ==
Qonggyai contains the Valley of the Kings, a series of graveyard tumuli, approximately 27 kilometres (17 mi) south of Tsetang, Tibet, near the town of Chongye or Qonggyai on Mure Mountain. The site possesses eight large mounds of earth resembling natural hills that are believed to contain eight to ten buried Tibetan kings.

According to Tibetan tradition all the kings from Drigum onwards are buried at ‘Phyong-rgyas, but as the site now presents itself, there are just ten tumuli identifiable as the tombs of all the kings from Songtsen Gampo to Ralpachen, including two princes.

Other sources, however, have indicated that there are actually nine mounds rather than eight or ten. The kings believed to be buried at the site include Songtsen Gampo (the founder of the Tibetan Empire), Mangsong Mangtsen, Tridu Songtsen, Gyangtsa Laban, Me Agtsom, Trisong Detsen, Muné Tsenpo and Ralpacan.

Qonggyai Dzong was established in mid-14th century under Phagmodrupa rule. Under the Ganden Podrang, the county was part of Lhoka Governor's (Tibetan: སྤྱི་ཁྱབ་, Wylie: spyi khyab) jurisdiction. Since 1960, Qonggyai county is part of Lhoka (Shannan) prefecture.

== Geography and climate ==
Qonggyai County is located in the middle of the Brahmaputra River valley and covers an area of 1030 square km, with186,667 hectares (461,260 acres) of arable land, an area of 86,667 hectares (214,160 acres) of grassland, with a forest area of 46,667 hectares (115,320 acres). The county had a total population of 20,000 people in 2003.

Qonggyai County is located in southern Tibet and is surrounded by mountains. It has an average elevation of about 3900 meters, with a maximum altitude of 6450 meters. It is in a temperate semi-arid plateau monsoon climate zone, with an annual frost-free period of about 125~53 days. The annual rainfall is 345 millimeters and natural disasters, mainly droughts, floods, hail and pests are common. Mineral resources include mainly crystal stone, jade, chromium and iron. Antelope, black-necked crane, otter, swan, eagle and river deer are common.

Climate data for Qonggyai, elevation 3,741 m (12,274 ft), (1991–2020 normals)
| Month | Jan | Feb | Mar | Apr | May | Jun | Jul | Aug | Sep | Oct | Nov | Dec | Year |
|---|---|---|---|---|---|---|---|---|---|---|---|---|---|
| Mean daily maximum °C (°F) | 8.5 (47.3) | 10.5 (50.9) | 12.6 (54.7) | 15.6 (60.1) | 19.3 (66.7) | 22.9 (73.2) | 22.3 (72.1) | 21.9 (71.4) | 20.9 (69.6) | 17.5 (63.5) | 13.1 (55.6) | 10.4 (50.7) | 16.3 (61.3) |
| Daily mean °C (°F) | −0.3 (31.5) | 2.2 (36.0) | 4.9 (40.8) | 7.7 (45.9) | 11.7 (53.1) | 15.5 (59.9) | 15.3 (59.5) | 14.7 (58.5) | 13.5 (56.3) | 9.4 (48.9) | 3.8 (38.8) | 0.7 (33.3) | 8.3 (46.9) |
| Mean daily minimum °C (°F) | −8.3 (17.1) | −6.0 (21.2) | −2.6 (27.3) | 0.8 (33.4) | 5.0 (41.0) | 9.3 (48.7) | 10.1 (50.2) | 9.1 (48.4) | 7.5 (45.5) | 2.0 (35.6) | −4.6 (23.7) | −7.5 (18.5) | 1.2 (34.2) |
| Average precipitation mm (inches) | 0.5 (0.02) | 1.7 (0.07) | 5.5 (0.22) | 13.1 (0.52) | 26.3 (1.04) | 56.3 (2.22) | 114.3 (4.50) | 85.5 (3.37) | 44.6 (1.76) | 8.7 (0.34) | 2.5 (0.10) | 0.7 (0.03) | 359.7 (14.19) |
| Average precipitation days (≥ 0.1 mm) | 0.8 | 1.1 | 2.9 | 7.3 | 9.7 | 14.4 | 21.8 | 19.2 | 12.5 | 3.5 | 0.9 | 0.3 | 94.4 |
| Average snowy days | 1.7 | 2.1 | 6.0 | 7.5 | 1.0 | 0 | 0 | 0 | 0 | 1.3 | 1.9 | 0.6 | 22.1 |
| Average relative humidity (%) | 23 | 24 | 30 | 39 | 42 | 47 | 60 | 61 | 54 | 39 | 30 | 26 | 40 |
| Mean monthly sunshine hours | 243.1 | 216.4 | 225.7 | 214.8 | 231.3 | 216.8 | 174.7 | 188.5 | 195.2 | 239.0 | 244.8 | 252.1 | 2,642.4 |
| Percentage possible sunshine | 74 | 68 | 60 | 55 | 55 | 52 | 41 | 47 | 53 | 68 | 77 | 79 | 61 |
Source: China Meteorological Administration

== Economy ==
Qonggyai is dominated by agriculture, and is one of the grain based counties in Shannan. Crops grown are mainly highland barley, winter wheat, spring wheat, peas, radish, potatoes and so on. Livestock include yak, pianniu, cattle, sheep, goats, mainly. A forested area of 150 acres (0.61 km^{2}) contains some apple, pear and peach orchards. Ethnic handicrafts forms most of the industrial sector and products include buckets, kettles, Tibetan cabinets, bowls, bracelets, necklaces, incense, butter lamps, etc.

The capital, Qonggyai Town (Qonggyai, Chongye) contains an ancient castle, and covers 0.5 km^{2} (0.19 sq mi), with a population of nearly 500 people. Commercial, financial, telecommunications, hospitals, schools and other public facilities are located in this small political, economic, and cultural center.

== Administrative divisions ==
Qonggyai County contains 1 town and 3 townships.

| Name | Chinese | Hanyu Pinyin | Tibetan | Wylie |
|---|---|---|---|---|
Towns
| Qonggyai Town (Chongye) | 琼结镇 | Qióngjié zhèn | འཕྱོངས་རྒྱས་གྲོང་རྡལ། | 'phyongs rgyas grong rdal |
Townships
| Gyemen Township | 加麻乡 | Jiāmá xiāng | རྒྱས་སྨན་ཤང་། | rgyas smad shang |
| Sharsü Township | 下水乡 | Xiàshuǐ xiāng | ཤར་བསུས་ཤང་། | shar bsus shang |
| Lhayül Township | 拉玉乡 | Lāyù xiāng | ལྷ་ཡུལ་ཤང་། | lha yul shang |
