= Orgyen Lingpa =

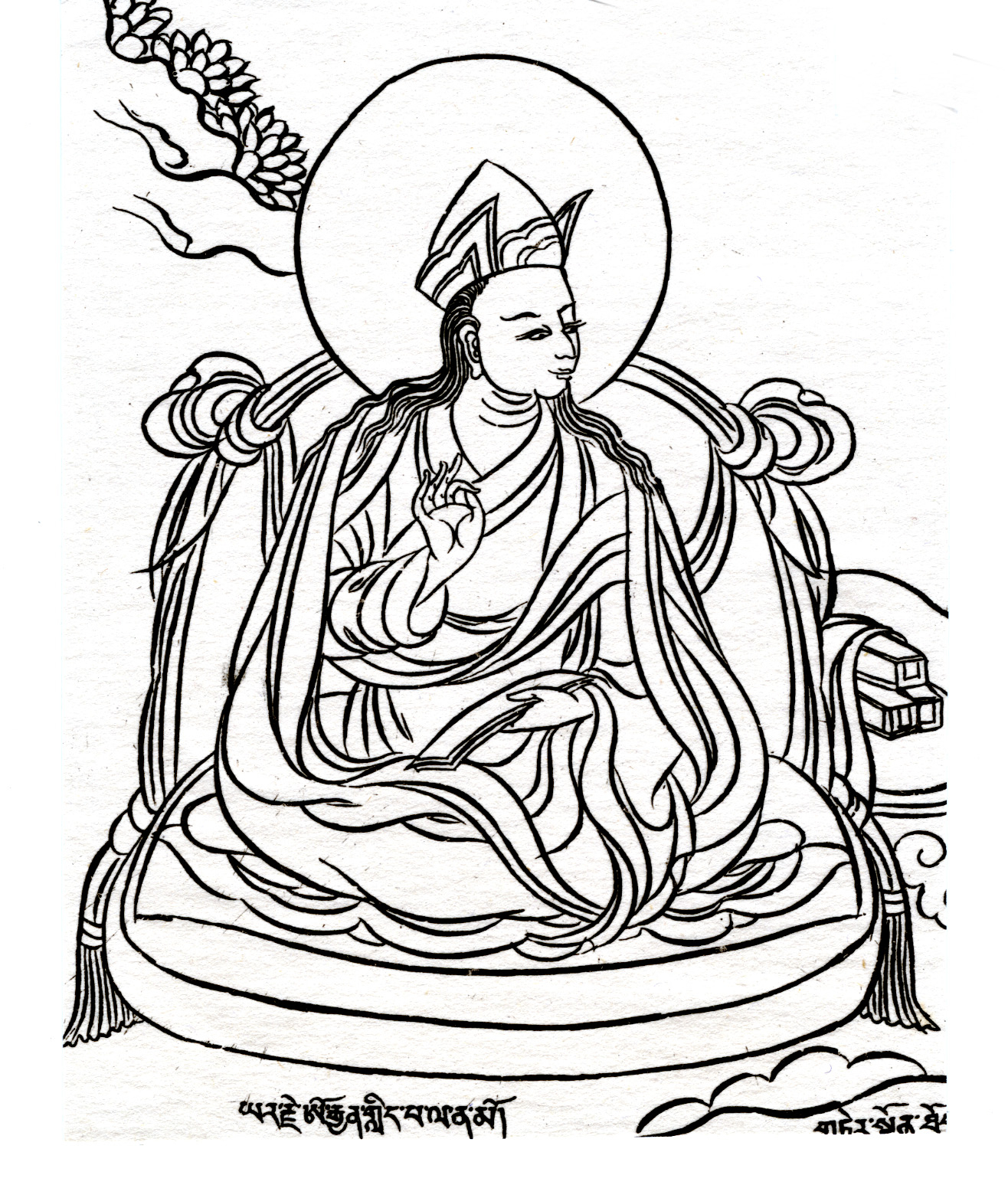
- Orgyen Lingpa

Personal life
- Born: 1323 "Either in Chumopak (chu mo phag), in the Tamshul (gtam shol) region of Lodrak (lho brag), or Yarje (yar rje) in the Tranang (gra nang) region of Lhokha (lho kha)"
- Died: c. 1360 Eyul (e'i yul), in Dakpo (dwags po)

Religious life
- Religion: Buddhism

Senior posting
- Reincarnation: Seventh incarnation of Lhase Muruk Tsenpo, a son of King Trisong Detsen

Orgyen Lingpa (o rgyan gling pa), (1323 – c. 1360) was a Tibetan tertön (treasure-finder) of the 14th century.

At the age of twenty-three he is said to have discovered an extensive treasure inventory (gter ma kha byang) at Samye Monastery in the Red Stupa."

He discovered texts, images, ritual objects and jewels, chiefly at Shetak, Yugang Drak, and Drachi Drakpoche. Of the 100 texts that were revealed by him, the Katang Denga are the most important to have survived. These five volumes chronicling the period of the Emperor Trisong Detsen include the Pema Katang, the most authoritative legendary biography of Guru Rinpoche. Orgyen Lingpa was born at Yarje in 1323.

Orgyen Lingpa discovered the important terma Pema Katang (The Life and Liberation of Padmasambhava) and many other important texts in the west-facing Pema Shelpuk cave near the entrance of the Yarlung Valley.

His father was a tantric yogin. Although Orgyen Lingpa was also a tantrika, to all outward appearances he was a monk — he neither married nor drank alcohol. He was a contemporary of Longchempa, who was born in the same valley, and also of Tai Situ Jangchub Gyeltsen who ruled Tibet from Tsetang, and was persecuted for his supposed Drigungpa loyalties.

There is evidence to suggest that [Orgyen Lingpa] fell afoul with Tai Situ Janchub Gyeltsen (ta'i si tu byang chub rgyal mtshan, 1302-1364) of the Pakmodru (phag mo gru) dynasty that supplanted the Sakya government of Tibet, and he went into exile in Eyul (e'i yul), in Dakpo (dwags po), where he died.
