= Nelpa Pandita =

Nelpa Pandita (Nel-pa Paṇḍita)
- Dragpa Monlam Lodro
- Born: 13th century Tibet
- Died: unknown
- Occupations: Kadampa monk, historian
- Works: Ne'u chos-'byung

Nelpa Pandita Dragpa Monlam Lodro (Tibetan: nel pa paNDi ta grags pa smon lam blo gros), or Ne'u Pandita was a 13th-century Tibetan Kadampa monk and historian from the Ne'u monastery (奈乌寺). He authored the Ne'u chos-'byung, the earliest known comprehensive account of the political and religious history of Tibet after its integration into the Chinese central realm. In his work, he expressed skepticism toward the Kagyu school and maintained a critical, factual approach to historical sources.

== Ne'u chos-'byung ==
Written in 1283 (i.e. earlier than the famous Buddhist History by Buton (1288) and the Clear Mirror on Royal Genealogy (1328)), the work The Flower Garland (Me tog phreng ba; also known as Ne'u chos 'byung) is divided into three parts History of Old Tubo (geography, administrative units, and the royal dynasty), Spread of Buddhism in Tubo (construction of monasteries and critical examination of legendary accounts), Analysis of the Chronology of the Dharma (Buddhist chronology and periods of rise, decline, and revival).

Nelpa Pandita recorded precise royal biographies, using the rab-byung chronology, and integrated political and religious history. The work remained unpublished until 1974 when it was prepared by Caiban Zhekang 才班哲康 (tshe-pal tai-kang) and later verified and published by Helga Uebach (1940–2021). In his (according to Treasury of Lives) "sober account", the author asserts

that around 433 CE certain Buddhist texts, including the Karandavyuhasutra and a text recorded under multiple names, including Pankyong Chagyapa (spang skong phyag brgya pa), were brought to Tibet by the masters Buddharaksita and Tilise from Khotan.

Wang Yao 王尧 and Chen Jian translated the work into Chinese.

== See also ==
- Ne'u chos-'byung (in German)
- lDe'u chos-'byung (in German)

== Bibliography ==
- Xizang shiji wubu《西藏史籍五部》བོད་ཀྱི་ལོ་རྒྱུས་དེབ་ཐེར་ཁག་ལྔ་ bod kyi lo rgyus deb ther khag lnga (gangs can rig mdzod 9) 西藏史籍五部. Xizang Zangwen guji chubanshe 西藏藏文古籍出版社 1990; ISBN 978-7-80589-003-6
- 扎巴孟兰洛卓：《奈巴教法史——古谭花鬘》 王尧，陈践 transl. (《中国藏学》1990) / 乃乌班智达扎巴门兰洛珠 (qikan.cqvip.com)
- Helga Uebach (transl.): Nel-pa Paṇḍitas Chronik Me-tog phreṅ-ba. Handschrift der Library of Tibetan Works and Archives; tibetischer Text in Faksimile, Transkription und Übersetzung, München: Kommission für Zentralasiatische Studien, Bayerische Akademie der Wissenschaften, 1987 (Studia Tibetica). Quellen und Studien zur tibetischen Lexikographie, 1
- Dan Martin: Tibetan Histories: A Bibliography of Tibetan-language Historical Works. 1997 (Online-Teilansicht)
  - Dan Martin in collaboration with Yael Bentor: Tibetan Histories: A Bibliography. Version October 21, 2020 (Online)
