= Ralpachen =

7th Tibetan Emperor and 40th King of Tibet (802–838)

Tritsuk Detsen ཁྲི་གཙུག་ལྡེ་བཙན
- Tsenpo

King of Tibet
- Reign: 815–838
- Predecessor: Tridé Songtsen
- Successor: U Dum Tsen
- Lönchen: list Dro Trisumje Taknang; We Gyaltore Taknye
- Born: 802; Lhasa, Tibet
- Died: 838; Lhasa, Tibet
- Burial: Triteng Mangri Mausoleum, Valley of the Kings
- Spouse: Choza Pelgyi Ngangtsül
Era name and dates
- Kyitak (སྐྱིད་རྟག; Chinese: 彝泰; pinyin: Yítài): 815–838
Regnal name
- Tritsuk Detsen (ཁྲི་གཙུག་ལྡེ་བཙན)
- House: Pugyel
- Dynasty: Yarlung
- Father: Tridé Songtsen
- Mother: Droza Lhagyel Mangmojé
- Religion: Tibetan Buddhism

Tritsuk Detsen (Tibetan: ཁྲི་གཙུག་ལྡེ་བཙན, Wylie: khri gtsug lde btshan), better known by his nickname Ralpachen (Tibetan: རལ་པ་ཅན, Wylie: ral pa chen; c. 802–838), was the 40th King (Tsenpo) of Tibet from c. 815 to 838. He reigned after the death of his father, Sadnalegs, and brought the empire to its largest extent. He was assassinated by his younger brother Langdarma in 838. Ralpachen is one of the "Three Dharma Kings of Tibet", and referred to as "son of God" in the ancient Tibetan chronicle Testament of Ba.

Ralpachen is considered a very important king in the history of Tibet and Tibetan Buddhism, as one of the three Dharma Kings (chosgyal) of the Yarlung Dynasty, which include Songtsen Gampo the 33rd king, Trisong Detsen the 38th king, and Ralpachen. All three kings respectively contributed in bringing Mahayana Buddhism to Tibet, in revealing the Vajrayana through Guru Padmasambhava, and in supporting the growth of Buddhism, the building of monasteries, and the flourishing of Buddhism with imperial patronage. The Tibetan Empire during the reign of Ralpachen grew to its largest extent, and the military battles with the Tang Empire led to the 821–823 Tibet–Tang treaty. Three stelae were inscribed with the terms, and one of each was built in Lhasa at the Jokhang Monastery, in Chang'an, and at the agreed border.

The death of Ralpachen in 838 ended the imperial patronage of Tibetan Buddhism, which had begun about eighty years earlier around 755 with Padmasambhava, Shantirakshita and Trisong Detsen. Afterwards, Langdarma, Ralpachen's brother and successor, proceeded to nearly destroy Buddhism in Tibet, together with the 13 Buddhist monasteries, and their ordained monastics, which were built during the reign of Trisong Detsen.

== Early life ==
Ralpachen was the second eldest of five brothers. The eldest, Prince Tsangma, took Tibetan Buddhist vows with the Nyingma school. The third, U Dumtsen known as Langdarma, is referred to in the sources as "unfit to reign". The younger two brothers both died young.

== Political activities ==
The Tibetan Empire reached its greatest extent under his rule, and included parts of China, India, Nepal, the Kingdom of Khotan, Balti, Bruzha (Gilgit and Hunza), Zhangzhung, Hor-yul, Sog-yul, Yugur, and Kamilog (roughly equivalent to present-day Sichuan), as well as almost all of modern Xinjiang and Gansu.

Ralpachen's power was aided by the able military leadership of Zhang 'Bro sTag. In 810 Emperor Xianzong of Tang wrote asking for the return of three prefectures. In 816 Zhang 'Bro sTag led a raid led to within two days journey from the Uyghur capital at Ordu-Baliq. In 819 he attacked the Chinese town of Yanzhou, in the southern Ordos Desert close to the Great Wall of China, when he was referred to as "First Minister". During the negotiations for a peace treaty in 821 he led a violent attack against the Chinese, which may have contributed to Chinese willingness to make peace.

The reign of Ralpachen was characterized by conflicts with China and the Uyghur Khaganate to the north. Tibetans attacked Uyghur territory in 816 and were in turn attacked in 821. After troops were sent towards the Chinese border, Buddhists in both countries sought mediation and the Sino-Tibetan treaty completed in 821/822, which insured peace for more than two decades. Tibet also made peace with the Uyghurs and also, apparently, with the Kingdom of Nanzhao in 822.

A bilingual account of the treaty with China, including details of the borders between the two countries is inscribed on a stone pillar, erected in 823, which stands outside the Jokhang in Lhasa. There was also a pillar with the treaty inscribed on it erected in China and a third was apparently placed at Gugu Meru at the border (which is said by locals to have been stolen by a party of French Tibetologists).

== Culture and Buddhism ==
Ralpachen was a generous supporter of Buddhism and invited many craftsmen, scholars and translators to Tibet from China, Nepal, Kashmir and the Kingdom of Khotan. He also promoted the development of Tibetan literature and translations, which were greatly aided by the development of a detailed Sanskrit-Tibetan lexicon, Mahāvyutpatti, which included standard Tibetan equivalents for thousands of Sanskrit terms. He decreed that all translations must be done directly from Sanskrit.

Ralpachen was considered to be an emanation of Vajrapani and encouraged Indian and Tibetan scholars to translate the Tripiṭaka, the Commentaries, and ancient Tantras into the Tibetan language.

The king respected monks very much. He had two long braids, when he sat down, he put the end of his long braids under the left and right seats and let the monks sit on them, thus he got a nickname, Ralpachen, literally, "the man with long braids".

During his reign, and even after his death into the 840s, thousands of copies of the Aparimitāyurnāma sūtra (Sūtra of Immeasurable Light), as well as hundreds of copies of the Śatasahasrikaprajñāpāramitāsūtra and the Mahāprajñāpāramitāsūtra (Perfection of Wisdom Sūtra) were produced as offerings to Ralpachen.

Ralpachen built a magnificent nine-story stone temple of 'U shang near the confluence of the Tsangpo and Kyi Rivers. The lower stories were of stone, the three middle ones of brick and the top three of wood. It was famous for its remarkable golden roof. On the top floors, he stored Buddhist scriptures, stupas and images, while the middle floors were used by scholars and translators, and the bottom floors by the court and for state affairs. He also remodeled and restored older temples.

He introduced standard weights and measures based on the ones in China. He enforced the Indian canonical regulations for the clergy and organised many classes of priesthood, assigning a revenue from seven families for each Buddhist monk and proscribed strict penalties for anyone showing disrespect to them.

His royal summer camp near modern Lhasa was "a palatial military pavilion", "wonderfully decorated with golden figures of tigers, panthers, and dragons."

== Death and succession ==
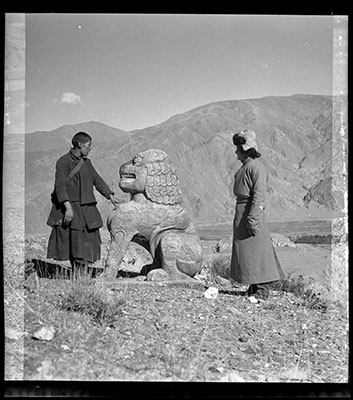
Stone lion on burial mound of King Ralpachen in Chongye Valley

Ralpachen was, according to the most common Tibetan tradition, murdered by two pro-Bon ministers who then placed his anti-Buddhist brother, Langdarma, on the throne. Some accounts suggest that his death was an accident due to a slip on the steps of the temple of Maldro, while the Old Book of Tang state that he became sick and was unable to take control of affairs of state and then, later, died.

The latter theory finds support in a damaged manuscript from Dunhuang containing a prayer for the good health of the king. The late Chinese work, the Tongjiangangmu by Zhu Xi (1130–1200), claims that Ralpachen had been sick for almost the whole of his reign and had, therefore, been unable to travel around his empire. He is said to have died at the end of the year 838.

This same work mentions under the very next year, 839, that a feverish epidemic had gone on for several years among the Uighurs killing "an infinite number of people."

A reference to this epidemic in 839 is also found in the New Book of Tang 217B.1b. It is possible that it was this epidemic which brought about Ralpachen's death, though it could equally have been the result of his chronic illness.

Ralpachen, then, died late in 838 and was buried near the Yarlung Valley; his tomb decorated with "a remarkable stone lion carved in a style said by some modern scholars to be Persian."

== Footnotes ==
Regnal titles
| Preceded by Sadnalegs | Emperor of Tibet; 817–838 | Succeeded by Langdarma |
