= Old Tibetan Chronicle =

Collection of texts

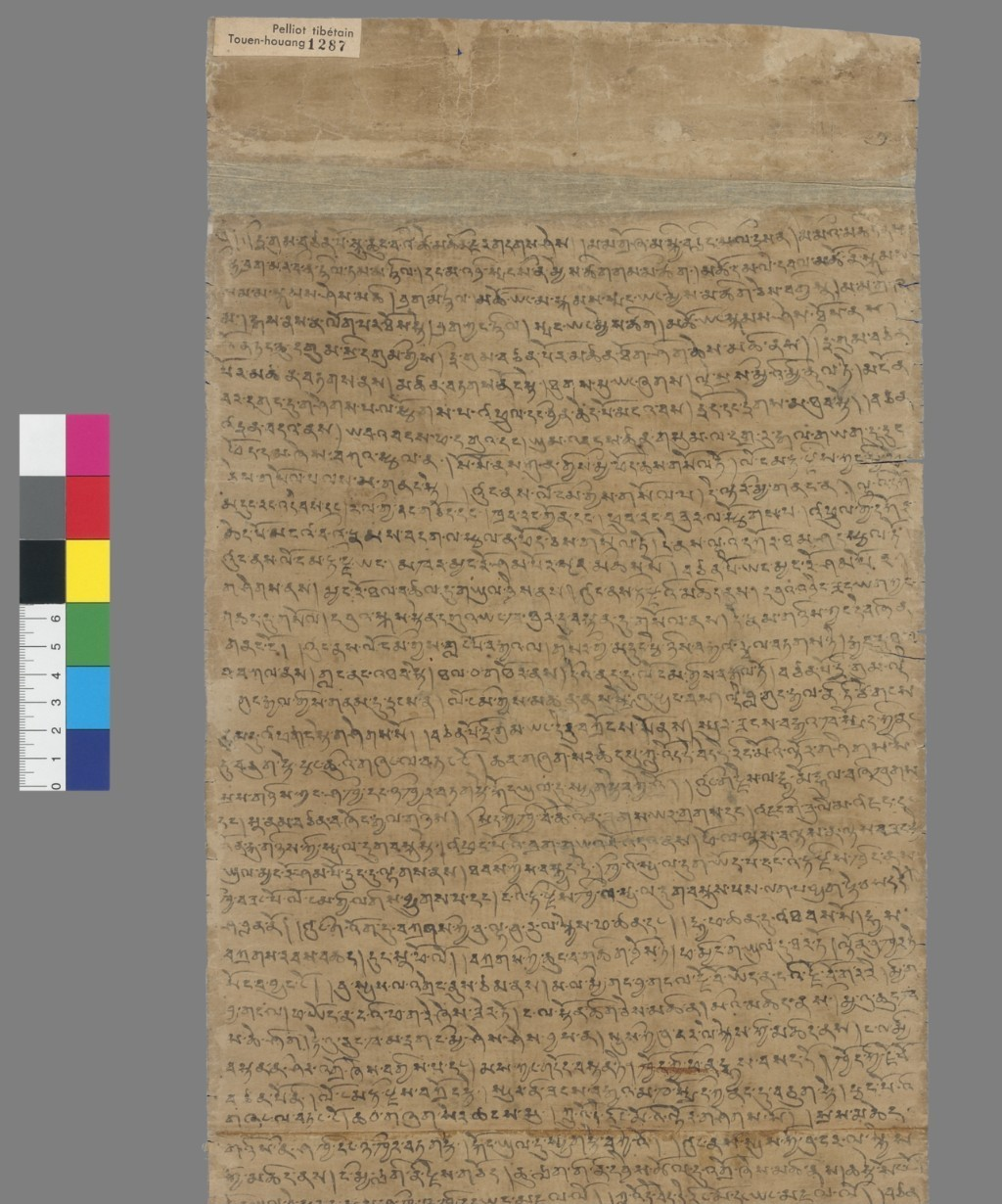
First page of Old Tibetan Chronicle

The Old Tibetan Chronicle is a collection of narrative accounts and songs relating to Tibet's Yarlung dynasty and the Tibetan Empire. The three manuscripts that comprise the only extant copies of the Chronicle are among the Dunhuang Manuscripts found in the early 20th century in the so-called "hidden library" at the Mogao Grottoes near Dunhuang, which is believed to have been sealed in the 11th century CE. The Chronicle, together with the Old Tibetan Annals comprise Tibet's earliest extant history.

== Discovery ==
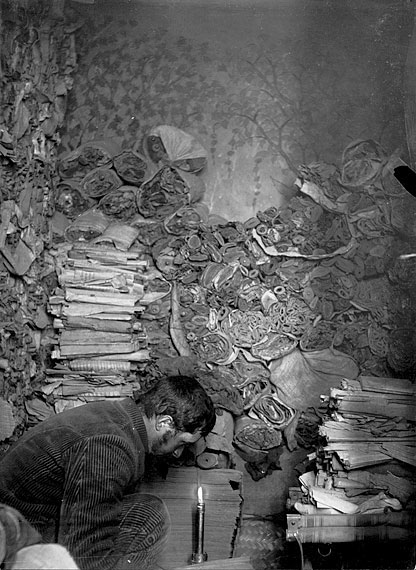
Paul Pelliot examines manuscripts in cave 17

An enormous number of early manuscripts in a variety of languages were collected by Aurel Stein and Paul Pelliot at the famous sealed-up Library Cave (no. 17) of the Mogao Grottoes at Dunhuang and sent back to London and Paris respectively. The Dunhuang manuscripts in the Tibetan language include the Old Tibetan Chronicle, which was probably compiled in the early 9th century, and the Old Tibetan Annals, which have been described as "the first and single most important documents available on early Tibetan history."

The Old Tibetan Chronicle is extant in two manuscripts in the Pelliot Collection at the Bibliothèque nationale de France in Paris, and some manuscript fragments. The main scroll comprises Pelliot tibétain 1286 and Pelliot tibétain 1287. The Tibetan text is written on the blank verso sides of panels pasted together from Chinese scrolls. In the first critical edition of Pelliot tibétain 1286 and Pelliot tibétain 1287, Jacques Bacot and Charles Toussaint considered them to be represent separate texts and referred to Pelliot tibétain 1286 as "Principautés anciennes et généalogie des rois," but following the suggestion of Geza Uray, both are now considered to be two parts a single original manuscript and can be referred to together as the Old Tibetan Chronicle. In addition, two folios from a single original manuscript, Pelliot tibétain 1144 and IOL Tib J 1375, overlap with narratives found in the Chronicle, though differing in certain details.

== Contents ==
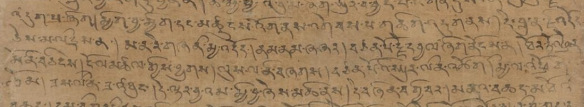
Tale about Drigum Tsenpo

The Old Tibetan Chronicle is a composite text of various lists, narratives and bardic songs arranged to form a single account of the reigns of the Tibetan emperors. As the list of the Tibetan emperors found in the narrative ends with U Dumten ('U'i dum brtan), later known as Langdarma, the Chronicle must have been compiled during or soon after the reign of this emperor, that is, in the 840s. Geza Uray has argued that this composition was made in Dunhuang itself rather than Central Tibet.

The Chronicle begins with a series of lists - of marriage alliances, principalities, emperors and ministers. The list of emperors is prefaced by an account of the descent of the first emperor Nyatri Tsenpo (gNya'-khri bTsan-po) from heaven, and ends with an account of the death of Drigum Tsenpo, the first mortal in the line. After this the Chronicle narrates the overthrow of the prince Zingpoje - this narrative is also represented in the fragmentary Version II of the Chronicle. The narrative then continues with an account of the following Tibetan emperors before coming to the reign of Songtsen Gampo (r. c.605–649). This section actually concentrates on the activities of the minister Khyungpo Pungse. The Chronicle then continues with a narrative of the following emperors, before coming to Trisong Detsen (r. 756-c.800), in which his victory over the rival Tibetan king Lig Myi-rhya is celebrated. The Chronicle then returns to the reign of an earlier emperor Tridu Songtsen (676–704), and his victory over a claim to rule Tibetan by the Gar clan.

The Chronicle does not offer a comprehensive account of the history of Tibet. This is partly because of the nature of its composition from earlier narratives and songs. It has also been argued by Lajos Ligeti and Geza Uray that the material in the Chronicle represents the interests of specific Tibetan clans, namely the Dba' and Myang clans (Ligeti adds the Mnon and Tshe-spong clans as well). In this it is comparable to another early Tibetan historical text, the Testament of Ba, which represents the interests of the Dba' clan. Contradicting later Tibetan Buddhist histories, neither the Annals nor the Chronicle make any mention of Buddhism in the reign of Songtsen Gampo. However, the Chronicle does say that, during the reign of king Trisong Detsen (Khri srong lde brtsan- ruled from 755 to 797 or 804 CE), "The incomparable religion of the Buddha had been received and there were viharas (monasteries) in the centre as well as the borderlands of the country."

== Problems with chronology ==
It has been clear since the Chronicle was first published that there are problems with its chronology. The victory over Lig Myi-rhya is narrated in the section on Trisong Detsen, yet in the victory song and the following narrative the emperor named is Songtsen Gampo, who ruled over a century earlier. Furthermore, the Chronicle ends in the reign of Tridu Songtsen (676–704), which should come between Songtsen Gampo and Trisong Detsen. There are two main theories regarding this anachronism. Ariane Macdonald and Yoshiro Imaeda have argued that the problems with chronology arose because the Chronicle was composed from a variety of different sources. Tibetologist Uray Géza on the other hand has argued that the scroll of Pelliot tibétain 1287 was cut up and rearranged some time after it was originally written, and the chronological problem results from this. He suggests that this later cutting and pasting may have been done specifically in order to associate the conquest of Lig Myi-rhya with the emperor Trisong Detsen, pointing out that the Bonpo historical tradition also makes that association.
