= Prince Tsangma =

9th-century Tibetan prince

Prince Tsangma (Tibetan: ལྷ་སྲས་གཙང་མ, Wylie: Lha sras Gtsang ma) was the eldest son of King Sadnalegs of Tibet. In Bhutanese traditions, he is held to be the first King of the eastern region.

== Sources ==
The oldest account of Tsangma is found at Chos 'byung me tog snying po sbrang rtsi'i bcud, which is generally assumed to be a late-twelfth century work by Nyangrel Nyima Özer. (Note: Daniel A. Hirshberg challenges this assumption; he proposes that Nyang Rel had only produced a core narrative of Tri Song-détsen and Padmasambhava, that others developed into the comprehensive history.) Bod kyi srid don rgyal rabs, drafted by Grags pa Rgyal mtshan around late 12th–early 13th century, contains two relevant passages. A similar passage is also found in the late 13th century Chronik Me-tog Phren-w of Nel-pa Pandita. Among later Tibetan sources—with an increasing tendency to martyrize Tsangma—are Sba bzhed zhabs brtags pa, written c. mid 14th century, Rgyal rabs gsal ba'i me long, a work by Dampa Sonam Gyaltsen, and Mkhas pa'i dga' ston, an early 16th-century work by Pawo Tsuglag Threngwa.

The oldest source in Bhutanese tradition that covers Tsangma comprehensively is Rgyal rigs ’byung khungs gsal ba’i sgron me (trans. The Lamp which Illuminates the Origins of Royal Families), written by a monk from East Bhutan in 1678 C.E. Prior to this, the only mention is in the 15th century text of Bshad mdzod yid bzhin nor bu by Don dam Smra ba’i seng ge from East Bhutan.

== Biography ==
=== Birth ===
Both Grags pa Rgyal mtshan and Nel-pa Pandita note Tsangma to be the eldest son of Sadnalegs. While the former did not provide any date of birth, Pandita mentions the Year of Dragon (800 C.E.) Other sources contradict that Tsangma was the eldest.

=== Exile, Bhutan, and assassination ===
==== Tibetan sources ====
Both Grags pa Rgyal mtshan and Nel-pa Pandita provide an identical narrative, down to the details: Tsangma was exiled to Bum thang of Lho brag (var. Lho Mon). There, he was poisoned to death by two queens: ’Brom bza’ Legs rje and Sna nam Me rje the’u (var. Sna nam Mang mo rje). In Ardussi's opinion, these were extracted in a piece-meal fashion from some more detailed narrative. The only such extant text by Nyangrel Özer supports such a hypothesis: more additional details are integrated into the same framework. Tsangma, after being poisoned, entered Bhutan via Paro valley and visited the Spyal Ka rock cave to hide religious treasures and royal documents (brought from Tibet), where he was finally interred. (Note: The identification of Spyal Ka cave has fascinated academics: there is one Bcal cave in Paro, where a corpus of early medieval Bon literature was discovered in 2001. They were allegedly deposited by Tsangma's uncle, Khyi kha ra thod, an exiled Bon.)

Later Tibetan sources would support this broad narrative—exile, death by poisoning, and a trip to Bhutan—but tweak the details to establish Tsangma as a Buddhist martyr. Pawo Tsuglag Threngwa added that many monks, scholars, and translators had accompanied the exiled Tsangma till the crossing of Gtsang Po where he proclaimed of his innocence but determined to make it to exile, requested them to turn back. (Note: He introduced slight differences to the details: Bum thang became Kho thing and only the latter of the queens was implicated for the poisoning.) Writing in Bod kyi (c. mid-seventeenth century), the Great Fifth outright depicted him to be a seeker of Nirvana.

==== Bhutanese sources ====
Bhutanese sources cite Tibetan sources but skips all mentions of exile and death; instead, an incredibly detailed narrative of his exploits in Bhutan is crafted. According to Rgyal rigs, Tsangma left Western Bhutan after a short stay and embarked eastward, to the Tibetan frontiers of Tawang. However, Tawang was hardly unaffected by the Tibetan struggles of power and hence, he made it back to Btsan mkhar of ’Brog mdo gsum. (Note: ’Brog mdo gsum is identified with Doksum, a small hamlet.) There, he chose the site of Mi zam pa—an elevated valley, surrounded by rivers—to establish a fort. (Note: Local tradition identifies this site with the ruins of a castle, located on a ridge above the Kholongchhu, about ten miles northwest of Trashigang. This castle is also referred to in the biography of 6th Dalai Lama (written by Sde srid Sangs rgyas rgya mtsho) as Mi zim mkhar but the construction is attributed to Khyi kha. A C-14 analysis of the ruins gave a date of 1305–1460 (~95% accuracy) and hence, Ardussi believes it to be unlikely that the castle was constructed by either. Thang stong rgyal po is a likelier candidate.)

=== Descendants ===
==== Tibetan sources ====
Neither Grags pa Rgyal mtshan nor Nel-pa Pandita mention anything about his marriage or issues but agree on his descendants ruling over the territories of exile. Later Tibetan sources are silent on these aspects.

==== Bhutanese sources ====
Per Ryal rigs, Tsangpa had married the daughter of one A mi Don grub rgyal, a native of Mi zam pa who claimed descent from the holy A mi Byang chub ’dre bkol. He had two sons from the marriage—Khri mi Lha’i dbang phyug and Gces bu Mthong legs btsun—who succeeded him. Within years, Tsangpa's lineage would command extraordinary fame and Khri mi would be requested to establish hereditary rule over Tawang, where the lineage became known as Khams pa Jo bo. Gces bu stayed as the ruler of Mi zam pa(Mizimpa), and two of his sons—Gong dkar rgyal and Dpal bsked dar—went on to establish rule over adjacent territories. They would be warmly welcomed by the subjects, courtesy associated royal prestige and conferment of political stability. More than twenty different clans are mentioned to have arisen out of the early descendants of Tsangma, who would go on to establish royal authority across Bhutan.

Bshad mdzod simply noted all rulers of Bhutan to have descended from Tsangpa — readers were asked to consult the written records of Tsangpas for further details.

== Bibliography ==
- Ardussi, John A. (2007a). "A preliminary investigation of Bhutanese castle ruins and caves associated with Lha Sras Gtsang Ma". In Ardussi, John A.; Pommaret, Francoise (eds.). Bhutan: Traditions and Changes - Proceedings of the Tenth Seminar of the IATS, 2003. Brill's Tibetan Studies Library. Brill. ISBN 978-90-474-2023-1.
- Ardussi, John A. (2007b). "Notes on the rGyal rigs of Ngawang and the Clan History of Eastern Bhutan and Shar Mon". In Prats, Ramon N. (ed.). The Pandita and the Siddha: Tibetan Studies in Honour of E. Gene Smith. Amnye Machen Institute. ISBN 978-81-86227-37-4.
- Hirshberg, Daniel Alexander (2016). Remembering the Lotus-Born: Padmasambhava in the History of Tibet's Golden Age. Somerville, MA: Wisdom Publications. ISBN 978-1-61429-231-9.
- Mizuno, Kazuharu; Tenpa, Lobsang (2015), "Arrival of a Tibetan Prince in Monyul and Establishment of a Clan", in Mizuno, Kazuharu; Tenpa, Lobsang (eds.), Himalayan Nature and Tibetan Buddhist Culture in Arunachal Pradesh, India: A Study of Monpa, International Perspectives in Geography, Tokyo: Springer Japan, pp. 13–30, doi:10.1007/978-4-431-55492-9_2, ISBN 978-4-431-55492-9
- Whitecross, Richard (2017). ""Like a Pot without a Handle": Law, Meaning and Practice in Medieval Bhutan". Cahiers d'Extrême-Asie. 26: 87–104. doi:10.3406/asie.2017.1490. ISSN 0766-1177. JSTOR 26606608.
