= Shaten Monastery =

Buddhist temple in Nagqu Town, Tibet

The Shaten Monastery (tib. zhabs brtan dgon pa; Chinese: 孝登寺; pinyin: Xiàodēng sì, also 夏登寺 Xiàdēng sì) is a temple located in Nagqu Town in the Tibet Autonomous Region of China, which is associated with the Gelug school of Tibetan Buddhism (Vajrayana).

== History ==
The monastery was founded in 1724 by the fourth Drukhang Rinpoche (sgrub khang sprul sku; Chinese: 珠康活佛; pinyin: Zhūkāng huófó). Today, the seventh line holder of this incarnation line is Drukhang Thubten Khedrup (sgrub khang thub bstan mkhas grub; 珠康·土登克珠; born 1955), vice president of the Political Consultative Conference of Tibet Autonomous Region (TAR) and vice chairman of China's Buddhism Association.

One branch of the Tibetan Buddhist Institute (西藏佛学院 Xīzàng fóxuéyuàn; founded in 2011) was officially established there in 2013 (besides two others at Sera Monastery and Samye Monastery).

== Cultural Relics Protection Unit of the Tibet Autonomous Region ==
Since 2013, the monastery has been on the list of (the province-level) Cultural Relics Protection Units of the Tibet Autonomous Region 西藏自治区文物保护单位 (6–134).

== See also ==
- China Advanced Institute of Tibetan Buddhism (in Chinese)
- Sera Utsé Hermitage
