= Mutik Tsenpo =

(Disputed) Tsenpo

- Tsenpo

King of Tibet
- Reign: 799 – 800
- Predecessor: Muné Tsenpo
- Successor: Sadnalegs
- Lönchen: Dro Trisu Ramsha
- Born: Unknown
- Died: c. 800
- Burial: Kyadem Mausoleum, Valley of the Kings
Regnal name
- Mutik Tsenpo
- Dynasty: Yarlung
- Father: Trisong Detsen
- Mother: Tsépongza Métokdrön

Mutik Tsenpo (Tibetan: མུ་ཏིག་བཙན་པོ་, Wylie: Mu-tig btsan-po) or Murug Tsenpo (Tibetan: མུ་རུག་བཙན་པོ་, Wylie: Mu-rug btsan-po) was sometimes considered as king of the Tibetan Empire, nevertheless questionable. Moreover, the whole period between the reigns of Trisong Detsen and Sadnalegs is very unclear, with several conflicting reports.

Trisong Detsen was said to have four sons: Mutri Tsenpo, Muné Tsenpo, Mutik Tsenpo, and Sadnalegs. The eldest son, Mutri Tsenpo, died early.

Muné Tsenpo is said to have taken power when his father, Trisong Detsen retired (probably around 797 CE). After a short reign, Muné Tsenpo, was supposedly poisoned on the orders of his mother, Tsephongsa, who was jealous of his beautiful young wife, Queen Phoyongsa. After his death, Mutik Tsenpo was next in line to the throne.

Several sources, however, claim that Mutik Tsenpo murdered a senior minister and was exiled to Lhodak Kharchu (lHo-brag or Lhodrag), near the Bhutanese border in the south, so the throne was taken by Sadnalegs instead.

Some sources say that Mutik Tsenpo was later killed by members of sNa-nam clan, but this couldn't have happened until after Sadnalegs became king, as Sadnalegs mentions in an inscription at Zhwa'i-lha-khang that he took power from his father, that one of his brothers had died, and that he bound his elder brother, Mur-rug-brtsan, with an oath.

== Reincarnation ==
Orgyen Lingpa (1323 – 1360) was said to be his seventh incarnarnation.

Regnal titles
Preceded by Muné Tsenpo	Emperor of Tibet; 798	Succeeded by Sadnalegs
