= Magyal Dongkar =

Tibetan empress

Tibetan name
- Tibetan: ཚེ་སྤང་བཟའ་རྨ་རྒྱལ་ལྡོང་སྐར
Transcriptions
- Wylie: tshe-spang-bza' rma-rgyal-ldong-skar
- THL: tsé pang za ma gyel dong kar

Tsepangsa Magyal Dongkar (Tibetan: རྨ་རྒྱལ་ལྡོང་སྐར, Wylie: rma-rgyal-ldong-skar, ? – ?) was an Empress consort of Tibet in the eighth century. She was empress of Trisong Detsen, the famous Dharma king. Unlike her husband, she was a follower of Bon.

== Life ==
She was born and raised in "Tsepang" clan. the "Tsepang" clan came from Zhangzhung, and was one of a most important supports of Bon.

=== Empress ===
Trisong Detsen was interested in Buddhism, he sent Vairotsana to India to study Vajrayana together with another four monks. They were ordered to propagate Buddhism after they returned to Lhasa. Many Tibetan nobles combined against them in the lead of the empress. According to Padma-thang-yig (Tibetan: པདྨ་ཐང་ཡིག), the empress said as below in the public place, and was supported by a majority of ministers:

The so-called kapala are skulls of human beings; basuta are organs removed from men; rkang-gling are horns made of virgins' shinbones; zhing-cheg 'yang-gzhi are flayed skins; rakta are offerings sprinkled by blood; dkyil-'khor are colorful balls like rainbow; gar-pa are men whom wearing prayer beads which made by human bones. ... It [Vajrayana] is not a religion, it's evil come from India into Tibet.

— Padma-thang-yig, vol. 79

The empress demanded Trisong Detsen to put the five monks to death. The emperor had no choice but to throw them into prison. The emperor arrested five beggars and had them executed, and put their bodies into five copper pots. The pots were thrown into Yarlung Tsangpo River in the public eye. Then the emperor told his ministers that the five monks were executed, while still-living monks were released secretly and hidden in the palace translating Tantras into Tibetan. The empress exposed this matter to ministers, Trisong Detsen had to exiled them to Rgyalrong (modern Ngawa Autonomous Prefecture in Sichuan).

Later, Trisong Detsen invited Śāntarakṣita and Vimalamitra came to Tibet to spread the latest understanding of the teaching, they were obstructed by the empress without any exception. Śāntarakṣita could do nothing but to invite another famous teacher Padmasambhava come to Tibet for help. Trisong Detsen received empowerment from Padmasambhava, in turn, he gave one of his spouses named Yeshe Tsogyal to Padmasambhava as dakini (see also Karmamudrā). The emperor's decision was strongly opposed by many nobles, including the empress Magyal Dongkar, and the famous general Nganlam Takdra Lukhong. They thought it was "absolutely ridiculous": Padmasambhava occupied the emperor's spouse, and he would occupied the emperor's throne next time. In response, the emperor hosted a famous debate between Buddhist and Bon supporters, and the winner would be recognised as the "state religion" in Tibet. Bon was supported by the empress and Nganlam, but finally, Trisong Detsen announced that Buddhist was the winner. Bon was declared as illegal religion, their scriptures were buried into ground or thrown into water. Nganlam refused to carry out this order. He was caned in public then exiled to Changtang. The king of Zhangzhung was also dissatisfied with this decision. He led a rebellion against emperor, and was quickly put down.

Now Magyal Dongkar and her clan members had to convert to Buddhism. She built a temple named Kams-gsum-zangs-kang-gling (ཁམས་གསུམ་ཟངས་ཁང་གླིང) for Buddhist, but was still not trust by the emperor due to her relationship with Zhangzhung and Bon before. "Tsepang" members were banned from political affairs, and came into conflict with the powerful Lönchen, Nanam Shang Gyaltsen Lhanang, whom was Trisong Detsen's uncle. On one occasion, the emperor sent dbu ring, whom was Shang Gyaltsen's son, to guard the palace gate in order to prevent "Tsepang" members from entering. Prince Murug, who was the empress' own son, was angered. He killed dbu ring and broke into the palace. Trisong Detsen was infuriated, and exiled Murug to Changtang.

=== Empress dowager ===
Shang Gyaltsen died in 796, and Trisong Detsen died next year. The empress' son Muné Tsenpo was installed as the new emperor, "Tsepang" members came into power again and exiled Yeshe Tsogyal. But, Muné Tsenpo was interested in Buddhism instead of Bon, and he buried his father in Buddhism rites. The young king also tried to protect his wife pho-yong-bza' rgyal-mo-btsun, a devout Buddhist whom the former emperor wanted him to protect, which made Magyal Dongkar very angry. She found an excuse then had her killed. The relations between mother and son became strained after this event. Magyal Dongkar poisoned the young emperor, and ordered the exiled prince Murug come back to take the throne. Murug was assassinated by "Nanam" members on his way to Lhasa.

Sadnalegs was the only one survived prince of Trisong Detsen after this assassination, and he came to the throne with the help of a Buddhist monk, Nyang Tingngezin Sangpo. After Sadnalegs' succession, "Tsepang" members were removed from their positions and banned from taking part in any political activities. Her name was not mentioned in the later history records.
