= Nyang Tingdzin Zangpo =

Buddhist monk of Tibetan Empire

Nyang Tingdzin Zangpo (Tibetan: མྱང་ཏིང་ངེ་འཛིན་བཟང་པོ, Wylie: myang ting nge vdzin bzang po, ? – ?), also known as Nyang Tingdzin or Banchenpo Tingdzin, was a Buddhist monk of the Tibetan Empire. He was the master of Sadnalegs. After Trisong Detsen's death, Tibet was in a turmoil, two prince were murdered. Nyang Tingdzin protected the youngest prince Sadnalegs, and finally helped him succeeded the throne in 798. He was appointed as the first "Banchenpo" (Wylie: ban chen po, "Monk Minister") and seized the power. His name can be found in a pillar which still stands outside the zhyu'i lta khang temple in Maizhokunggar today.

After the anti-Buddhist king Langdarma came to the power, Nyang Tingdzin tried to flee to India, but was captured and executed.

== Sources ==
- Leschly, Jakob (August 2007). "Nyang Tingdzin Zangpo". The Treasury of Lives. ISSN 2332-077X.
