= Radoi Monastery =

Buddhist temple in Qüxü County, Tibet

The Radoi Monastery or Redui Temple (Chinese: 热堆寺; pinyin: Rèduī sì) is a temple located in Nyêtang Township, a village in Qüxü County in the Lhasa Prefecture in the Tibet Autonomous Region of China, approximately 12 miles south-west of Lhasa.

== Location ==
It is located 2 kilometres (1.2 mi) northwest of the village of Redui (热堆村) via National Road G318 and 41 kilometres (25 mi) from the county's urban center.

== History ==
It was founded in 1205 by the Han-Chinese Qin Rewa (Chinese: 秦热娃), among six temples that he established in Ü-Tsang.

It is today mainly associated with the Gelug school of Tibetan Buddhism (Vajrayana).

The Monastery sponsors the annual "dharma assembly" (法会) for debating Buddhist scriptures. Besides reciting and debating Buddhist scriptures, the Buddhist accomplishments of monks are tested for getting a degree.

== Tibetan Buddhist Institute ==
Six teenage Lamas from Tibet graduate from middle school and receive the title 'Nedang·Chanranba' (2020)

The courtyard houses the Tibetan Buddhist Institute (西藏佛学院 Xīzàng fóxuéyuàn), which was founded in 2011.

Branches of the Tibetan Buddhist Institute were officially established in 2013 at Sera Monastery, Samye Monastery, and Shaten Monastery (in Nagqu Town).

== Cultural Relics Protection Unit of the Tibet Autonomous Region ==
Since 2013, the monastery has been on the list of (the province-level) Cultural Relics Protection Units of the Tibet Autonomous Region 西藏自治区文物保护单位 (6-44).

== See also ==
- China Advanced Institute of Tibetan Buddhism (in Chinese)
