= History of Buddhism in India and Tibet =

13th century Buddhist history book by Buton Rinchen Drub

History of Buddhism in India and its Spread to Tibet (bde gshegs bstan pa'i gsal byed chos hyi 'byung gnas) (Tibetan: བུ་སྟོན་ཆོས་འབྱུང, Wylie: bu ston chos 'byung) is a historical text by Buton Rinchen Drub, a famous Sakya master, written either in 1322 or 1356.

The History of Buddhism was translated into English by Eugene Obermiller in 1931. It was translated by Ngawang Zangpo and by Lisa Stein then published in 2013 by Shambhala Publications.

== See also ==
- Ne'u chos-'byung

== Published ==
- Obermiller, E.: The history of Buddhism (Chos ḥbyung) by Bu-ston. I The Jewellery of Scripture, II The history of Buddhism in India and Tibet. Harrassowitz, 1931–2; Reprinted 1986, New Delhi: Sri Satguru Publications.
- Buton Rinchen Drub, (c.1356) 2013. History of Buddhism in India and its Spread to Tibet. Translated by Ngawang Zangpo and Lisa Stein, Boston: Shambhala Publications.
