= Lama Dampa Sonam Gyaltsen =

Sakya Tibetan ruler (1312-1323)

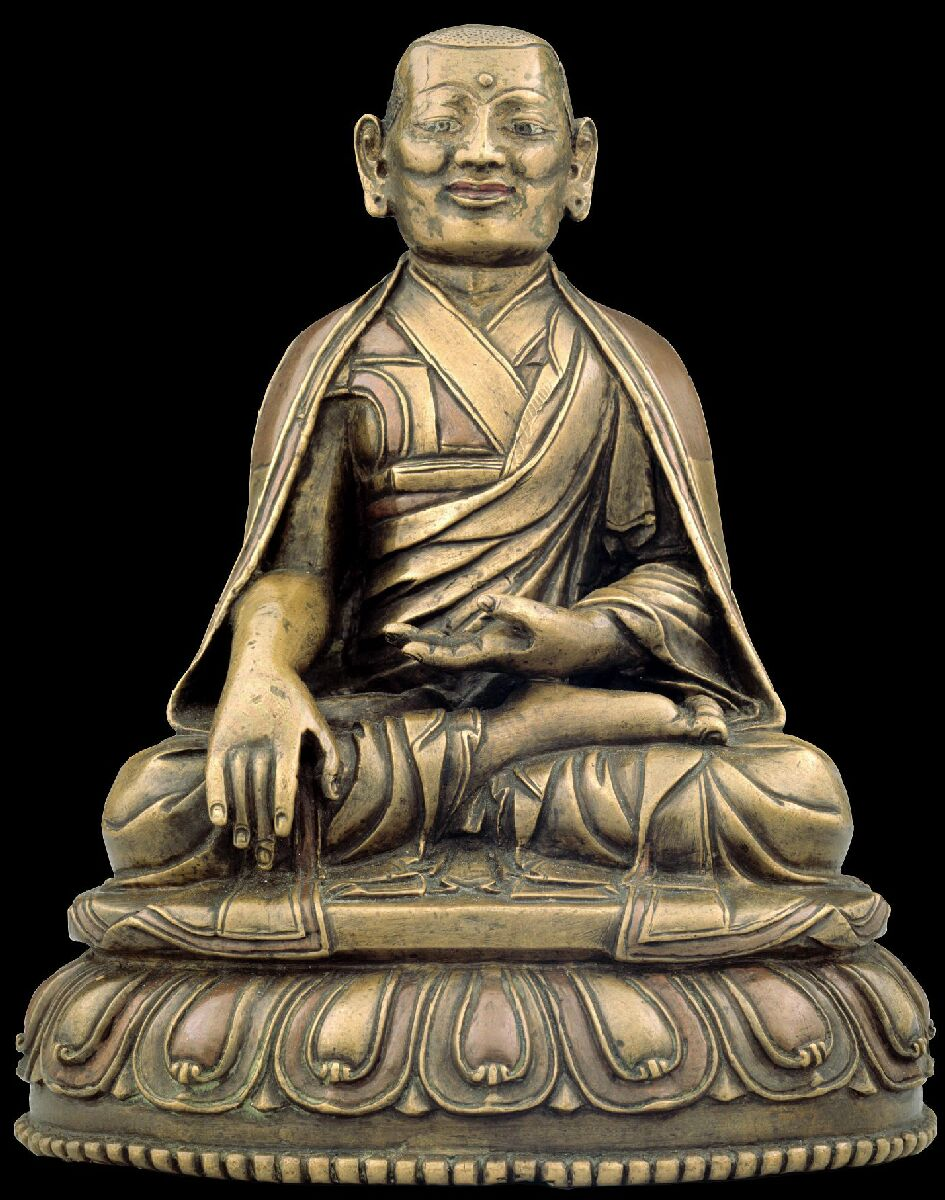

Sönam Gyaltsen, the Sakya Lama Dampa (Wylie: bsod nams rgyal mtshan sa skya pa bla ma dam pa) was a ruler of the Sakya school of Tibetan Buddhism who lived from 1312 to 1375. Sakya had a precedence position in Tibet under the Yuan dynasty. He is considered the greatest Sakya scholar of the 14th century and served as ruler for a short term in 1344–1347.

Sönam Gyaltsen is particularly notable for his scholarly works Clear Mirror on Royal Genealogy, his commentary on the Bodhisattvacaryāvatāra, his work on lamdre practice, as well as his work with Dölpopa Shérap Gyeltsen on the zhentong theory of the two truths doctrine.

== Political career ==
Sönam Gyaltsen, usually just known by his title, "Lama Dampa", was one of the thirteen sons of the abbot-ruler (dansa chenpo) Zangpo Pal who governed the see from 1306 to 1323 and therefore had a key position in the politics of Tibet under the overlordship of the Yuan emperor. His mother was Machig Shonnu Bum. His original name was Nyima Dewa'i Lotro; he received the name Sönam Gyaltsen when he was ordained as a novitiate monk in 1328. In 1331, at 19 years of age, he became a fully-ordained monk.

By this time, the power of the Sakya Monastery was in decline. Around the time of Zangpo Pal's demise in 1323, his numerous sons were divided into four branches residing in different palaces. Lama Dampa belonged to the Rinchengang branch which took power as upper rulers of Sakya after a clash in 1341. He succeeded his elder brother Jamyang Donyo Gyaltsen on his demise in 1344. Temporal administration of Tibet was handled by the dpon-chen Gyalwa Zangpo (1344-1347).

== Civil war in Central Tibet ==
However, his tenure saw the eruption of civil war in Central Tibet. This was a period when the Yuan Dynasty was in rapid decline and had few resources to monitor Tibetan affairs efficiently. One of the 13 myriarchies (trikor) of Central Tibet, Phagmodru, was led by the able and ambitious Changchub Gyaltsen who clashed with the rival Yazang myriarchy. The Sakya administration was unable to cope with the trouble efficiently. In 1346 open warfare flared up as Phagmodru was attacked by troops of Nyal and E, directed by Yazang. The Phagmodrupa were victorious, but the ponchen Gyalwa Zangpo and the Sakya cleric Kunpangpa conspired to kill the troublemaker and seize Phagmodru. Changchub Gyaltsen was treacherously arrested but refused to yield his prerogatives in spite of severe torture. A visit by Lama Dampa somewhat mitigated his lot as a prisoner. In early 1347 Gyalwa Zangpo was unexpectedly replaced by a new administrator, Wangtson, on the orders of the imperial court. The dismayed Gyalwa Zangpo now made a deal with his prisoner and released Changchub Gyaltsen. In the meanwhile Lama Dampa stepped down from his position after having kept the position of abbot-ruler for three years. We do not know the exact reasons for this. He was succeeded by a nephew, Lotro Gyaltsen. During the Sakya-Phagmodru fighting of the 1340s and 1350s he had an important role as negotiator. In 1373 the Phagmodrupa ruler Jamyang Shakya Gyaltsen asked him to head a politico-religious meeting in Nêdong, confirming his status as a highly respected lama.

== Religious and literary career ==
While Lama Dampa's involvement with Tibetan politics was of little consequence, his cultural efforts are the more impressive. He had been the religious teacher of Changchub Gyaltsen who eventually united Central Tibet under a new independent regime, the Phagmodrupa dynasty. Although the two men found themselves in opposing camps, they shared an interest in reviving the ideals of the old Tibetan Empire (c. 600–842). Some years after his abdication, Lama Dampa spent time and effort restoring Samye, the monastery associated with the old kings, which had been reduced to ruins during the fighting that preceded the Phagmodrupa victory. He subsequently authored a pseudo-historical work, Clear Mirror on Royal Genealogy (1368), where the historical details about the ancient kings were overlaid with Buddhist embellishments. The style of the narrative tended to retrospectively tone down the Chinese influences on Tibet which had accompanied the period of Mongol overlordship. The clear mirror made a great impact on the Tibetan view of their ancient history and thus supported Tai Situ Changchub Gyaltsen's project of national renewal. Lama Dampa also wrote extensive commentaries on the Pramāṇavārttika, Abhisamayalankara, Bodhisattvacaryāvatāra, and Nagarjuna's treatises. Towards the end of his life, in 1373, he was reportedly the teacher of the future Buddhist reformer Je Tsongkhapa. Lama Dampa died as a highly respected scholar in 1375.

== See also ==
- Tibet under Yuan rule
- History of Tibet
- Mongol Empire
- Sakya Trizin

Preceded by Jamyang Donyo Gyaltsen	Sakya lama of Tibet (Yuan overlordship); 1344–1347	Succeeded by Lotro Gyaltsen
