= Lotro Gyaltsen =

Last Sakya Tibetan ruler (1332-1365)

Lotro Gyaltsen in orthographic spelling, bLo gros rgyal mts'an, was a ruler of Sakya, who lived from 1332-1365. The clerical Sakya regime had a position of precedence in Tibet as one of their members was an Imperial Preceptor under the Yuan dynasty. Lotro Gyaltsen reigned from 1347 to 1365; however, Sakya lost its influence in Central Tibet in 1354. In that way he was the last Sakya lord before the ascension of the new Phagmodrupa dynasty.

== Sakya loss of influence ==
Since the 13th century the elite of the Sakya Monastery had been the instruments of the Mongol Yuan emperors based in northern China. However, with the decline of Mongol rule the Yuan court had less resources to monitor Tibetan affairs. This coincided with the split of the ruling Khon family of Sakya into four branches which were sometimes at odds. After the abdication of the learned Lama Dampa Sonam Gyaltsen in 1347, his 15-year-old nephew Lotro Gyaltsen was enthroned as the new dansa chenpo (abbot-ruler). Lotro Gyaltsen was the son of the tishri (imperial preceptor) Kunga Gyaltsen (1310–1358) and the sister of the lama Kunpangpa. The daily affairs of Tibet were handled by an administrator, dpon-chen or ponchen, who was also stationed in Sakya. During the era of Lotro Gyaltsen the holders of the office were Wangtson (1347 – c. 1350), Gyalwa Zangpo (c. 1350–1356/58), Namkha Tenpai Gyaltsen (c. 1357 and c. 1364) and Palbum (?–1360).

== Phagmodrupa victory ==
Meanwhile, Phagmodru, one of the 13 myriarchies (trikor) of Central Tibet, had become an increasingly assertive force under its energetic leader Changchub Gyaltsen. Changchub Gyaltsen was imprisoned by the dpon-chen Gyalwa Zangpo in 1346, but was released in the next year since Gyalwa Zangpo felt discontented with being replaced by Wangtson and wanted a strong ally. During the next years Changchub Gyaltsen fought Wangtson and various local regimes in Central Tibet with relative success. The young Lotro Gyaltsen had little influence on these events, and negotiations with Phagmodru were partly managed by his uncle and predecessor Lama Dampa Sonam Gyaltsen. In about 1350 Changchub Gyaltsen had become the dominating power in Ü (East Central Tibet). In 1354 the current dpon-chen Gyalwa Zangpo called on Changchub Gyaltsen to save Sakya from the Nangpa clan. The Phagmodru forces intervened successfully, and from this time the power of Sakya was restricted to its own estate. Moreover, there was internal strife in Sakya which eventually led to the murder of the influential lama Kunpangpa, uncle of Lotro Gyaltsen, in 1357. This was followed by the sudden demise of the dpon-chen Gyalwa Zangpo, possibly through foul play. Changchub Gyaltsen, who meanwhile received the title Tai Situ from the Mongol ruler Toghon Temür, now settled the affairs of the incapacitated Sakya and installed a garrison there. A scion of the Khon family called Kunga Rinchen was reportedly appointed abbot of the main Sakya palace Zhitog. Other information implies that Lotro Gyaltsen remained abbot until his death in 1365. Whatever the case, Changchub Gyaltsen ruthlessly crushed the last resistance by the ex-dpon-chen Wangtson in 1358 and was established as regent of entire Central Tibet (Ü-Tsang). Although he treated the clerical elite of Sakya with respect, their era as a Tibet-wide power were now definitely over.

== See also ==
- Tibet under Yuan rule
- History of Tibet
- Mongol Empire
- Sakya Trizin

Preceded by Lama Dampa Sonam Gyaltsen	Sakya lama of Tibet (Yuan overlordship); 1347–1354	Succeeded by Tai Situ Changchub Gyaltsen of Phagmodrupa
