= Uray Géza =

Uray Géza (16 August 1921 - 17 July 1991) was a 20th-century Hungarian tibetologist. He studied under Louis Ligeti, writing his dissertation on Tibetan dialects. Early in his career, he focused on linguistic issues, but gradually his work focused more on early Tibetan history and the analysis of the Dunhuang texts that serve as the primary sources for such study.

== Works ==
- Uray, Géza (1952). "A Tibetan diminutive suffix." Acta Orientalia Academiae Scientiarum Hungaricae 2:182-220
- Uray, Géza (1953). “Some problems of the ancient Tibetan verbal morphology: methodological observations on recent studies.” Acta Linguistica Academiae Scientiarum Hungaricae 3: 37-62.
- Uray, Géza (1953). “The suffix -e in Tibetan.” Acta Orientalia Academiae Scientiarum Hungaricae 3: 229-244.
- Uray, Géza (1954). “Duplication, germination and triplication in Tibetan.” Acta Orientalia Academiae Scientiarum Hungaricae 4.1-3: 177-256.
- Uray, Géza (1955). [review of Vorob'ev-Desjatovskij Tibetsij dokument na derev.] Acta Orientalia Academiae Scientiarum Hungaricae 4.1-3: 304-307.
- Uray, Géza (1955). “On the Tibetan Letters ba and wa: Contribution to the Origin and History of the Tibetan Alphabet.” Acta Orientalia Academiae Scientiarum Hungaricae 5.1: 101-121.
- Uray, Géza (1960). “The Four Horns of Tibet according to the Royal Annals.” Acta Orientalia Academiae Scientiarum Hungaricae 10.1: 31-57.
- Uray, Géza (1961). “Notes on a Tibetan Military Document from Dunhuang.” Acta Orientalia Academiae Scientiarum Hungaricae 12: 223-230.
- Uray, Géza (1962). “The offices of the bruṅ-pas and great mṅans and the territorial division of Central Tibet in the early 8th century.” Acta Orientalia Academiae Scientiarum Hungaricae 15: 353-360.
- Uray, Géza (1963). “Die Lehnfürstentümer des tibetischen Reiches VII.-IV. Jahrhundert." in B.G. Gafurov et al. Eds. Труды Двадцать пятого Международного конгресса востоковедов / Trudy Dvadcat’ pjatogo Meždunarodnogo kongressa vostokovedov (Moskva, Izdatel’stvo vostočnoi literatury), Vol. V, pp. 206–210.
- Uray, Géza (1964). “The Old Tibetan verb bon.” Acta Orientalia Academiae Scientiarum Hungaricae 17: 323-334.
- Uray, Géza (1966). “’Greṅ, the Alleged Old Tibetan Equivalent of the Ethnic Name Ch’iang.” Acta Orientalia Academiae Scientiarum Hungaricae 19: 245-256.
- Uray, Géza (1968). “A Chronological Problem in the Old Tibetan Chronicle.” Acta orientalia Academiae Scientiarum Hungaricae 11: 268-269.
- Uray, Géza (1971). “A propos du tibétain rgod-g-yuṅ.” Études tibétaines dédiées à la mémoire de Marcelle Lalou. Paris: Adrien Maisonneuve. 553-557.
- Uray, Géza (1972). “The Narrative of Legislation and Organization of the Mkhas-pa’I dga’-ston: the origins of the traditions concerning sron-brcan sgam-po as first legislator and organizer of Tibet.” Acta Orientalia Academiae Scientiarum Hungaricae 26.1: 11-68.
- Uray, Géza (1972). “Queen Sad-mar-kar's Songs in the Old Tibetan Chronicle.” Acta Orientalia Academiae Scientiarum Hungaricae 25: 5-38.
- Uray, Géza (1975). “L’annalistique et la practique bureaucratique au Tibet ancient.” Journal Asiatique 263: 157-170.
- Uray, Géza (1978). “The Annals of ‘A-ža Principality, The problems of Chronology and Genre of the Stein Document. Tun-huang, vol. 69, fol. 84.” Proceedings of the Csoma de Kőrös memorial symposium. Ed. Louis Ligeti. Budapest: Akadémiai Kiadó. 541-578
- Uray, Géza (1979). “The Old Tibetan Sources of the History of Central Asia up to 751 A.D.: a Survey.” Prolegomena to the Sources on the History of Pre-Islamic Central Asia. Ed. J. Harmatta. Budapest: Akadémiai Kiadó: 275-306.
- Uray, Géza (1980). “KHROM: Administrative units of the Tibetan Empire in the 7th–9th Centuries.” Michael Aris & Aung san Suu Kyi (eds.), Tibetan studies in honour of Hugh Richardson: Proceedings of the International Seminar on Tibetan Studies, Oxford 1979. Westminster: Aris & Phillips. 310–318
- Uray, Géza (1981). “L’emploi du tibétain dans les chancelleries des états du Kan-sou et de Khotan postérieurs à la domination tibétaine.” Journal Asiatique 269.1-2: 81-90.
- Uray, Géza (1982). “Notes on the thousand-districts of the Tibetan Empire in the first half of the ninth century.” Acta Orientalia Academiae Scientiarum Hungaricae 36: 545-548.
- Uray, Géza (1983). "Tibet’s Connections with Nestorianism and Manicheism in the 8th–10th Centuries." In Steinkellner and Tauscher (eds), "Contributions on Tibetan Language, History and Culture." Vienna: Arbeitskries für Tibetische und Buddhistische studien Universität Wien.
- Uray, Géza (1984). “The Earliest Evidence of the use of the Chinese Sexagenary Cycle in Tibetan.” Tibetan and Buddhist Studies Commemorating the 200th Anniversary of the Birth of Alexander Csoma de Kőrös. Ed. Louis Ligeti. Vol 2. Budapest: Akadémiai Kiadó: 341-360.
- Uray, Géza (1988) “New Contributions to Tibetan Documents from the post-Tibetan Tun-huang.” Tibetan Studies: Proceedings of the 4th Seminar of the International Association for Tibetan Studies Schloss Hohenkammer – Munich 1985. Eds. Helga Uebach and Jampa L. Panglung. (Studia Tibetica: Quellen und Studien zur tibetische Lexicographie 2). Munich: Kommission für Zentralasiatische Studien Bayerische Akademie der Wissenschaften: 514-528.
- Uray, Géza (1988). “Ñag.ñi.dags.po: A Note on Historical Geography of Ancient Tibet.” Orientalia Iosephi Tucci Memoriae Dicata. Eds. G. Gnoli and L. Lanciotti. (Serie Orientale Roma 61.3) Rome: Instituto Italiano per il medio ed estremo oriente. 1503-1510.
- Uray Géza (1989). “Contributions to the date of the Vyutpatti-treatises.” Acta Orientalia Academiae Scientiarum Hungaricae 43.1: 3-21.
- Uray, Géza (1990) “The title dbaṅ-po in Early Tibetan Records.” Indo-Sino-Tibetan: Studi in Onore di Luciano Petech. Ed. Paolo Daffinà. (Studi Orientali 9). Rome: Bardi Editore.
- Uray, Géza (1991) "The Location of Khar-can and Leṅ-ču of the Old Tibetan sources", Varia Eurasiatica, Szeged, 195-227.
- Uray, Géza, and Helga Uebach (1994). "Clan Versus Thousand-District Versus Army in the Tibetan Empire." Tibetan Studies, Ed. Per Kvaerne. Oslo: The Institute for Comparative Research in Human Culture.

== Works in Honour of Uray Géza ==
- 1991 E. Steinkellner (ed.), Tibetan history and language: studies dedicated to Uray Géza on his seventieth birthday, Arbeitskreis für tibetische und buddhistische Studien Universität Wien, Wien
