= Muné Tsenpo =

(Disputed) King of Tibet (762-799)

Muné Tsenpo མུ་ནེ་བཙན་པོ་
- Tsenpo

King of Tibet
- Reign: 797–799
- Predecessor: Trisong Detsen
- Successor: Mutik Tsenpo
- Lönchen: Dro Trisu Ramsha
- Born: c. 762
- Died: c. 799 (Aged 37)
- Burial: Kyari Dembu Mausoleum, Valley of the Kings, Tibet
- Spouse: Poyöza Gyel Motsün
Regnal name
- Muné Tsenpo
- Dynasty: Yarlung
- Father: Trisong Detsen
- Mother: Tsépongza Métokdrön
- Religion: Tibetan Buddhism

Muné Tsenpo (Tibetan: མུ་ནེ་བཙན་པོ་, Wylie: Mu-ne btsan-po; c. 762–799), also known as Murub Tsenpo, was the second son of Trisong Detsen and the de facto king of the Tibetan Empire from c. 797 to 799. Since his older brother died at a young age, Muné Tsenpo was enthroned when his father retired, and only reigned for one year and seven months. His name is a Zhangzhung name, meaning 'Namkha Tsenpo' or 'Sky King'.

Trisong Detsen had three sons. The eldest, Mutri Tsenpo, apparently died young. When Trisong Detsen retired in 797 to take up residence at the Nyugmakhar Palace (sMyug ma mkar) in Zungkhar (Zung mkhar), he handed power to the next eldest surviving son, Muné (Munrub) Tsenpo.

Most sources say that Muné Tsenpo's reign lasted only about a year and a half during which time he held important spiritual convocations at Samye and sponsored legal bills until his death at the age of 17 years. Some western historians believe this would have been too short and suggest he reigned from 797 to 804. The Deb-ston erroneously records a reign of 17 years, which was his age at death, and may be attributed to a misreading of the Chinese accounts.

The Testament of Ba states that Muné Tsenpo insisted that his father's funeral be performed according to Buddhist rather than the Bon rites.

The Ba source say he tried three times to ensure the equitable distribution of land and property in Tibet; but Shakabpa writes each time the rich got richer and the poor got poorer. He established four major shrines to worship the Tripitaka and the abhisambodhi.

In 799, after a brief reign, Muné Tsenpo was reportedly poisoned on the orders of his mother, Tsephongsa, who was jealous of his wife's beautiful looks. After his death, his brother Tridé Songtsen (Sadnalegs) took the throne and was presumably ruling by 804 CE.

Some sources due to clerical errors have incorrectly listed Mutik Tsenpo and Sadnalegs as two different people. These sources erroneously say that the youngest brother Mutik was said to have been banished to Lhodak Kharchu (lHo-brag or Lhodrag) near the Bhutanese border for murdering a senior minister, and that Sadnalegs took his place on the throne, although some other people believe he ruled for an indeterminate period.

== Sources ==
- Central Asian Studies (Germany)
- http://dabase.org/padma-lb.htm

Regnal titles
Preceded by Trisong Detsen	Emperor of Tibet; 797–804?	Succeeded by Mutik Tsenpo
