= Tai Situ Changchub Gyaltsen =

1st Phagmodrupa Tibetan ruler (1302-1364)

Chinese name
- Traditional Chinese: 絳曲堅贊
Transcriptions

Alternative Chinese name
- Traditional Chinese: 松秋堅贊
Transcriptions

Tibetan name
- Tibetan: ཏའི་སི་ཏུ་བྱང་ཆུབ་རྒྱལ་མཚན
Transcriptions
- Wylie: ta'i si tu byang chub rgyal mtshan

Tai Situ Changchub Gyaltsen (Tibetan: ཏའི་སི་ཏུ་བྱང་ཆུབ་རྒྱལ་མཚན, Wylie: ta'i si tu byang chub rgyal mtshan) (1302 – 21 November 1364 (Note: His date of death is likely 1364 but is sometimes given as 1371, 1373 or 1374; see Tiley Chodrag (1988), p. 353; Van der Kuijp (2003), pp. 433–4.)) was the founder of the Phagmodrupa dynasty that replaced the Mongol-backed Sakya dynasty, ending Yuan rule in Tibet. He ruled most of Tibet as desi (regent) from 1354 to 1364 (alt. 1371, 1373 or 1374). As a law-giver, politician and religious patron, he created a heritage that lasted centuries.

== Name ==
Tai Situ is the Tibetan transcription of the term Da Situ (大司徒) from Han language, meaning great Situ, referring to an office-holder or administrator. He was also sometimes called 松秋堅贊 in Chinese.

== The youth of Changchub Gyaltsen ==
The Phagmodru hermitage, situated on the northern bank of the Tsangpo River, was founded by Phagmo Drupa Dorje Gyalpo (1110–1170) who initiated a sub-sect of the Kagyu school of Buddhism. After his death a monastery called Thel arose at the place in the late 12th century. It is presently in ruins. The monastery was ruled by members of the noble Lang Family whose pedigree went back to ancient times. During the Sakya period, when regents called ponchen (dpon-chen) ruled Tibet under Mongol (Yuan) overlordship, Central Tibet was divided into thirteen myriarchies (Wylie: khri skor bcu gsum). One was Phagmodru with the palace of Nêdong as its center; it was headed by a lord of the Lang Family who bore the title tripon (myriarch). Phagmodru was allied to the Ilkhanate (1256 – 1335/1353) in Persia for a while, but its position was severely weakened by intervention by Kublai Khan, the Great Khan who founded the Yuan dynasty (1271–1368). Changchub Gyaltsen was born into the Lang lineage in 1302 as the son of Rinchen Kyab and his second wife Tramon Bumkyi. At the age of nine he was ordained as a monk and was introduced to the Buddhist teachings by the lama Lhakangpa. Changchub Gyaltsen was in particular devoted to the worship of the deity Hayagriva. At fourteen years of age he went to the Sakya monastery. While he initially wished to pursue a clerical career, his tutor persuaded him that he would make an excellent administrator.

== Lord of the Phagmodru myriarchy ==
In 1322 his uncle Gyaltsen Kyab, the lord of Phagmodru, was deposed due to incompetence. Changchub Gyaltsen was appointed to the post, receiving a seal with a tiger's head by the great khan Sidibala. The new tripon extended the Nêdong palace and surrounded it with a big wall. A bridge was constructed over the nearby Sham River. The tripon took care to rule according to Buddhist principles and enjoined his retainers to avoid alcohol and afternoon meals. He surrounded himself with young talented men and began to restore the fortunes of Phagmodru. The estate of Yazang was a bone of contention as it had previously slipped away from Phagmodru rule. The ambition to regain Yazang irritated the Sakya regime, which resorted to trickery. A Sakya official called Wangtson captured Changchub Gyaltsen at a banquet in 1336 and demanded that he cede the lordship of Phagmudru to a spurious "cousin". The prisoner refused to yield in spite of harsh treatment and was set free after three months. 1346 saw fresh fighting between Phagmodru and Yazang, and the latter was eventually beaten back. Now the ponchen Gyalwa Zangpo arranged a meeting at a bridge but proceeded to capture Changchub Gyaltsen in the middle of the deliberations. The Sakya troops then led their prisoner before the Nêdong palace and demanded its surrender. However, Changchub Gyaltsen's retainers refused to give up the place, and the prisoner was tortured and brought back to Sakya. When Changchub Gyaltsen entered Sakya the people pelted him with mud, and a clod hit his mouth. He then reportedly commented: "Now I eat the mud of Sakya – soon I will be eating Sakya itself".

== Taking power in Central Tibet ==
After several months of imprisonment an unexpected event caused a twist of alliances. Gyalwa Zangpo heard that the great khan Toghon Temür would replace him as ponchen with the ambitious Wangtson. He therefore made an alliance with Changchub Gyaltsen who was allowed back to his estate. Shortly after, Wangtson took charge of the governance of Central Tibet and gathered Tibetan and Mongol soldiers to attack Phagmodru. Though outnumbered, the troops of Changchub Gyaltsen repelled the Sakya attacks and began to occupy disputed neighboring areas. In 1349 most of Ü (East Central Tibet) was in the hands of Changchub Gyaltsen, including Lhasa. Four years later, in 1353, a last major attempt was made to stop the progress of Phagmodru. A coalition of Sakya, Drigung, Yazang and Nangpa attacked Changchub Gyaltsen's positions but had to retreat. The next year 1354 was decisive. By now the Sakya regime had become badly divided. Gyalwa Zangpo, who had regained the ponchen-ship in c. 1350, was hard pressed by the troops of Nangpa and in his desperation asked Changchub Gyaltsen "to uphold the law". In other words, Phagmodru was now seen as responsible for law and order even in Tsang. Changchub Gyaltsen dispatched a large army under Rinchen Zangpo. The Phagmodru troops defeated the Nangpa while fording the Shabchu River, then marched on Sakya. Before more had been done hostilities were halted. However, from now on the Sakya administration only governed its core land. As a consequence most of Tsang (West Central Tibet) came under the authority of Changchub Gyaltsen's regime, the Phagmodrupa. Seals of investiture to the various feudal lords were only given with the approval of Changchub Gyaltsen. In Tibetan historiography 1354 is usually singled out as the year when the Phagmodrupa gained power in Central Tibet; however it was in fact a long process that would take several more years of negotiations and petty fighting.

Two years after these events ponchen Gyalwa Zangpo was arrested by the chief abbot Lotro Gyaltsen. Once again Changchub Gyaltsen intervened in Sakya affairs, this time by peaceful means. He summoned a peace conference attended by Lama Dampa Sonam Gyaltsen, a well-respected lama of Sakya. The outcome was that the Sakya elite was forced to release Gyalwa Zangpo. Gyalwa Zangpo lost his prestige and formally submitted to Changchub Gyaltsen. In 1357 further internal strife wrecked the Sakya. The prominent lama Kunpangpa was murdered under obscure circumstances, and the ponchen Gyalwa Zangpo died as well, presumably murdered by the ex-ponchen Wangtson. This gave Changchub Gyaltsen an excellent excuse to intervene. He convened a conference in Sakya in 1358 to settle the affairs of Central Tibet. Although the results of the meeting were not quite satisfactory he left a garrison in Sakya. Forces from Lhatse under the ex-ponchen Wangtson created trouble but were quickly defeated by the Sakya and Phagmodru troops, Wangtson was imprisoned and 464 of his men were blinded. By this ruthless victory the power of the new regime was confirmed. Still it is clear from Changchub Gyaltsen's own autobiography that he encountered some opposition up to at least 1361, and that Sakya was still considered superior de jure, if not in fact. At any rate Changchub Gyaltsen stood out as the de facto ruler of Central Tibet towards the end of his life – several years before the Ming dynasty was established in China in 1368. Central China was wrecked by rebellions after 1354, so that the great khan of the Yuan dynasty had little time to spare for Tibetan affairs. The new ruler and his successors would govern Tibet independently for over eighty years until being replaced by the Rinpungpa. It was something of a golden age in the history of medieval Tibet due to the relative inner peace and the great cultural achievements.

== Undisputed ruler ==
As ruler Changchub Gyaltsen was keen to revive the glories of the Tibetan Empire of Songtsen Gampo. In effect, the new regent asserted Tibetan independence from the Mongol Yuan dynasty, and did not pay much attention to the crumbling Mongol court. Thus he revived the dress codes of the old Tibetan court, while the old Mongol court dress was rejected. In practice Mongols and mongolized Tibetans were deprived of positions of political authority. However, he never repudiated Mongol nominal rule, and accepted the title Tai Situ (Great Tutor) from the great khan in 1357. An embassy was dispatched for Dadu (Beijing) in 1360 and returned two years later. Emperor Toghon Temür well understood the strong position of Changchub Gyaltsen and readily issued an edict confirming his position. Personally he declined to take royal titles, but was content with the Tibetan title desi (sde-srid, regent). He re-organized the thirteen myriarchies of the previous Yuan-Sakya rulers into thirteen grand prefectures (dzongchen) which in turn were divided in districts (dzong). The centers of the districts were castles, also called dzong, which had military, economic and fiscal functions. The dzongchen were headed by civil and military administrators which retained the honorary title tripon and were appointed for three years. Changchub Gyaltsen used the noblemen belonging to his clientele, appointing them as dzongpon, district leaders. He abolished Mongol law in favour of a legal framework drawn from the old Tibetan legal code. A law code was promulgated in 15 chapters and was supposedly so effective that an old woman carrying a load of gold could travel securely through Tibet. The laws were much milder than the Mongol ones, but stipulated a division of society in nine classes. In the field of fiscal administration, he revised the revenue system so that one sixth of the produce was yielded as tax.

Changchub Gyaltsen was a prominent religious patron. He ordered many copies of the Kangyur (Buddha's words in translation) to be made. He entertained good relations with well-known religious scholars such as Buton Rinchen Drub, Gyelse Thokme and Lama Dampa Sonam Gyaltsen. During his time a number of putative ancient religious works, the Kathang Denga, were "rediscovered"; they extol the ancient Tibetan kings and the first arrival of Buddhism. Changchub Gyaltsen also earned fame as builder. In 1351 or 1352 he founded the great monastery of Tsetang with a college for debates on logic. He also gave subsidies to the meditation college of Thel and had a worship hall built. Of worldly constructions, he founded a number of dzong (castles) such as Chaktse Drigu, Olkha Taktse, Gongkar, Nêdong, Drakkar, Rinpung, Samdruptse, Panam, and Lhundruptse. He took care to establish guard-posts in the border regions, in particular at the Chinese frontier.

Tai Situ Changchub Gyaltsen died in 1364 and was succeeded by his nephew Jamyang Shakya Gyaltsen (Tibetan: འཇམ་དབྱངས་ཤ་ཀྱ་རྒྱལ་མཚན, Wylie: 'jam dbyangs sha kya rgyal mtshan, Chinese: 章陽沙加監藏; 1340–1373), also a monk. Although the rulers always belonged to the Lang Family, the first five incumbents were clerics who did not marry. The dignity of desi was therefore inherited by nephews, brothers or cousins. The subsequent undisputed rule of the Phagmodrupa lineage lasted until 1435. From 1435 to 1481 the power of the Phagmodrupa declined as they were eclipsed by the Rinpungpa, who patronized the Karma Kagyu school. They were followed by four generations of Tsangpa kings who ruled from 1565 to 1642, until Lobsang Gyatso, the 5th Dalai Lama (1617–1682), took control of Tibet and established the Ganden Phodrang regime with the support of Güshi Khan (1582–1655), a Mongol ruler of Kokonor and founder of the Khoshut Khanate.

== See also ==
- Tibet under Yuan rule
- Phagmodrupa dynasty
- Ming–Tibet relations
- Tai Situpa
- List of rulers of Tibet
- Tibetan History

== Notes ==
Preceded by Lotro Gyaltsen of Sakya (Yuan overlordship)	Ruler of Tibet; 1354–1364	Succeeded by Jamyang Shakya Gyaltsen
