= Clear Mirror on Royal Genealogy =

Work written by Lama Dampa Sonam Gyaltsen

Clear Mirror on Royal Genealogy (Tibetan: རྒྱལ་རབས་གསལ་བའི་མེ་ལོང, Wylie: rgyal rabs gsal ba'i me long; "The clear mirror" for short) was a pseudo-historical work written by Lama Dampa Sonam Gyaltsen, who was a ruler of Sakya during 14th century.
