= Valley of the Kings (Tibet) =

Burial site of historic Tibetan kings

- Chongye Valley
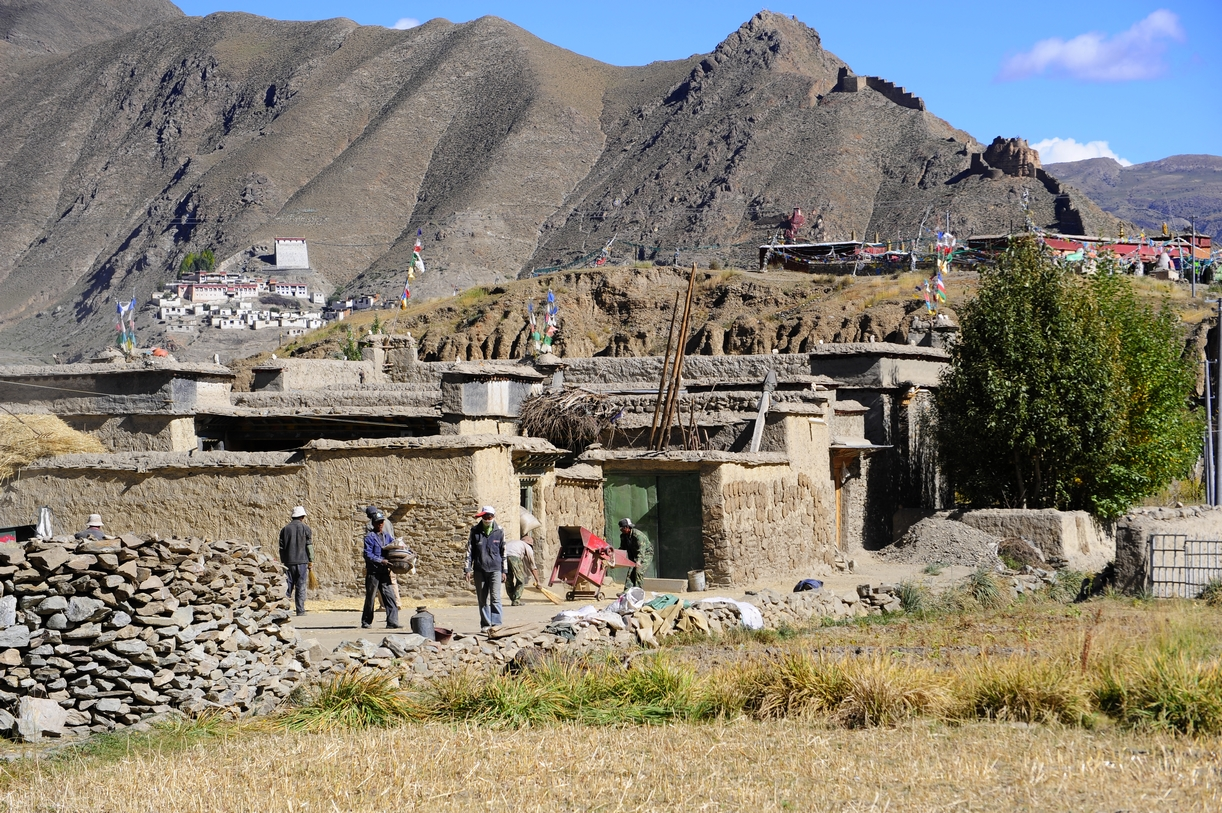
- Riwo Dechen monastery, Qonggyai, near the Valley of Kings

- Location within Tibet
- 29°0′36″N 91°40′48″E
- Type: valley
- Cultures: Tibetan Empire
- Location: Qonggyai, Shannan, Tibet, People's Republic of China

The Valley of the Kings (Tibetan: བོད་རྗེ་པང་སོ, Wylie: bod rje bang so) or Chongye Valley is a valley in Qonggyai County, Tibet, within the People's Republic of China. It is the location of eight tumuli, which are believed to be the burial mounds of eight to ten Tibetan rulers.

"According to Tibetan tradition all the kings from Drigum onwards are buried at ‘Phyong-rgyas, but as the site now presents itself, there are just ten tumuli identifiable as the tombs of all the kings from Songtsen Gampo to Ralpachen, including two princes . . . ."

Other sources, however, have indicated that there are actually nine mounds rather than eight or ten. The monarchs believed to be buried at the site include Songtsen Gampo (the founder of the Tibetan Empire), Mangsong Mangtsen, Tridu Songtsen, Gyangtsa Laban, Tride Tsuktsen, Trisong Detsen, Mune Tsenpo and Ralpachen.

== Features ==
The largest of the mounds, located near the north bank of the Qonggyai (Chonggye) River, has a reconstructed 13th-century temple dedicated to Songtsen Gampo. The temple was rebuilt with restored murals in 1983 and is maintained by three monks. Gampo's statue sits in the centre of the temple's altar, surrounded by statues of his Chinese wife, Wencheng, and his Nepalese wife, Bhrikuti, who holds a crystal ball. Eminent ministers stand to the side, including Sambhota, a noted Tibetan philologist held to be the founder of Tibetan writing. Behind this altar statue display is a crowned Maitreya with two Sakyamunis and a mural on the right wall depicting Indian deities of the 8th century AD.

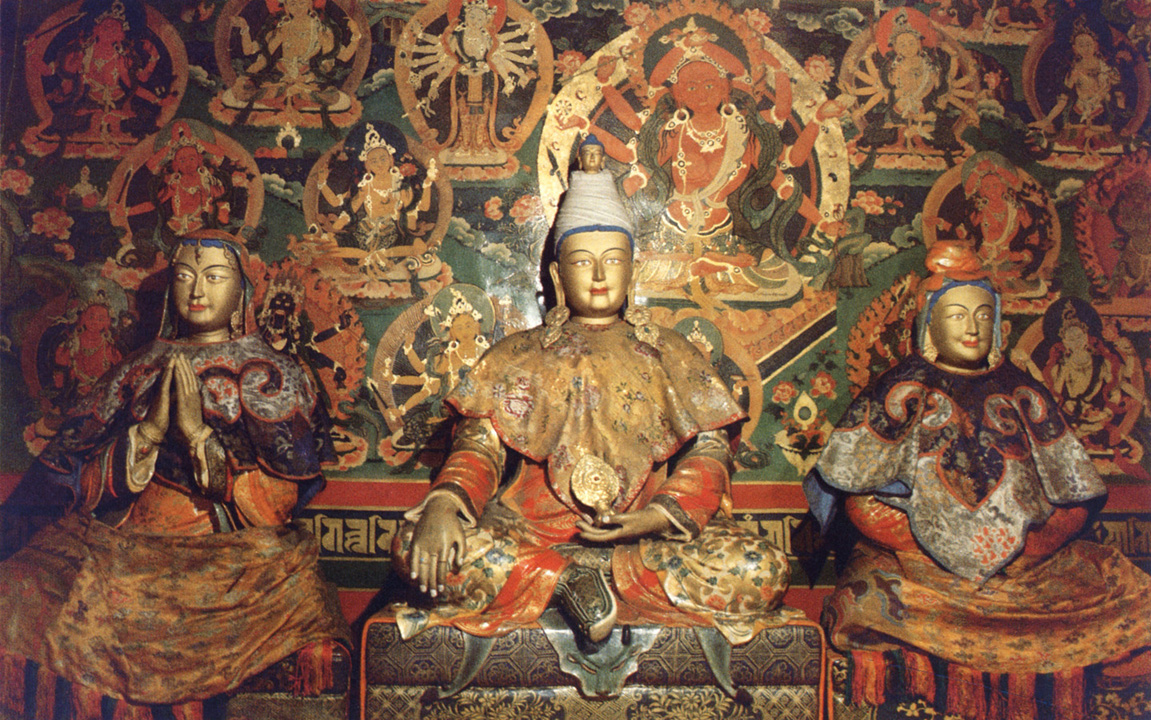
Songtsen Gampo (centre) Princess Wencheng (right) and Bhrikuti Devi of Nepal (left)

A number of scholars have raised doubts that this is the actual place where Gampo was laid to rest, given that it has not been formally excavated; others have speculated that he was actually interred in Jokhang, Lhasa. According to the ancient Tibetan Annals and Tibetan tradition, however, his tomb is believed to be located deep beneath the ground in a central, subterranean chamber in a silver coffin, with nine smaller chambers filled with treasures. According to the funeral rites listed in the annals, on the left side was a suit of armor worn by Songtsen Gampo on expedition, and on the right side were knights and battle horses made of solid gold which had been sacrificed with the king. Other sources indicate that the Tibetan Annals document has the inner part of the tomb having five halls and a central tomb chamber that is about 100 square meters in area and 13.4 meters (about 44 feet) high. Gampo's silver coffin is believed to be surrounded statues of him Anders of Sakyamuni and Avalokitesvara. Buried at the head of the coffin is a coral statue of Lord Loyak Gyalo, who is intended to give light to the dead king; at the foot of the coffin is a cache of pears weighing 35 kilograms, wrapped in silk, that symbolize Gampo's share of wealth. The tomb is, notably, believed to contain an extensive number of large gold and silver utensils, reliquary and commemorative artifacts.

== Further tombs ==
According to Tibetan history books such as the Grand Ceremonies of the Wise, Chronicle of Tibetan Kings and Officials, and Chronicles of Tibetan Kings and Clansmen, there were believed to be a total of 35 tombs of Tibetan Kings and concubines from the 29th King of Tibet to the last, divided into groups, with each group centred in a separate area in the Valley of Kings.

== See also ==
- Himalayas
- Naqsh-e Rustam – Persian "Valley of the Kings" royal tombs.
- Ming and Qing Imperial Tombs – Royal tombs of the Ming and Qing Dynasties.
- Sacred Valley (Peru)
- Tomb of Genghis Khan – An undiscovered place around of burial of Genghis Khan and his royal family.
- Valley of the Kings (Egypt)
