= Dharmaraja (Buddhism) =

Dharmaraja is the title of a Buddha, often mentioned in the Buddhist scriptures. For example, in the "Simile and Parable" (third) chapter of the Lotus Sutra, Shakyamuni says, "I am the Dharma King, free to do as I will with the Dharma. To bring peace and safety to living beings—that is the reason I appear in the world." Also, according to Mahayana Buddhism, each Buddha presides over his Pure Land, and hence this could explain the possible origin of the name Dharmaraja.
