= Buton Rinchen Drub =

Tibetan Buddhist leader and Sakya master (1290–1364)

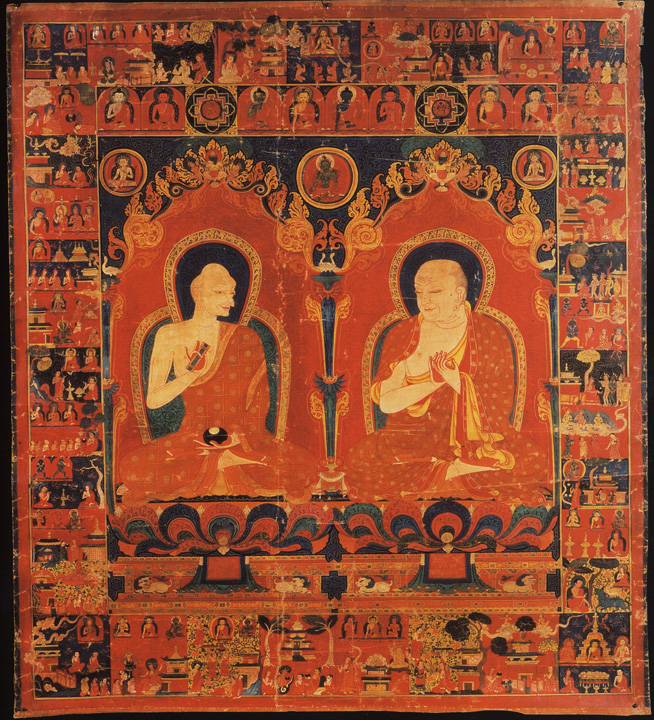
- A 14th-century wall painting depiction of abbot Buton Rinchen (left) and his successor

Tibetan name
- Tibetan: བུ་སྟོན་རིན་ཆེན་གྲུབ་
Transcriptions
- Wylie: bu ston rin chen grub
- THL: Butön Rinchen Drup
- Tibetan Pinyin: Pudoin Rinqênzhub
- Lhasa IPA: pʰutø̃ rĩtɕʰẽtʂup

Chinese name
- Traditional Chinese: 布敦仁欽竹
- Simplified Chinese: 布敦仁钦竹
Transcriptions
Standard Mandarin
- Hanyu Pinyin: Bùdūn Rénqīngzhú

Butön Rinchen Drup (Tibetan: བུ་སྟོན་རིན་ཆེན་གྲུབ་, Wylie: bu ston rin chen grub), (1290–1364), 11th Abbot of Shalu Monastery, was a 14th-century Sakya master and Tibetan Buddhist leader. Shalu was the first of the major monasteries to be built by noble families of the Tsang dynasty during Tibet's great revival of Buddhism, and was an important center of the Sakya tradition. Butön was not merely a capable administrator but he is remembered to this very day as a prodigious scholar and writer and is Tibet's most celebrated historian.

== Biography ==
Buton was born in 1290, "to a family associated with a monastery named Sheme Gomne (shad smad sgom gnas) in the Tropu (khro phu) area of Tsang ... [his] father was a prominent Nyingma Lama named Drakton Gyeltsen Pelzang (brag ston rgyal btshan dpal bzang, d.u.). His mother, also a Nyingma master, was called Sonam Bum (bsod nams 'bum, d.u.)."

Buton catalogued all of the Buddhist scriptures at Shalu, some 4,569 religious and philosophical works and formatted them in a logical, coherent order. He wrote the famous book, the History of Buddhism in India and Tibet at Shalu which many Tibetan scholars utilize in their study today.

After his death he strongly influenced the development of esoteric studies and psychic training in Tibet for centuries. The purpose of his works were not to cultivate paranormal magical abilities but to attain philosophical enlightenment, a belief that all earthly phenonoma are a state of the mind. He remains to this day one of the most important Tibetan historians and Buddhist writers in the history of Buddhism and Tibet.

Panchen Sönam Drakpa (1478-1554), the fifteenth abbot of Ganden monastery, became known as an incarnation of the great lama and historian, Bütön Rinchen Drupa.

== See also ==
- Zhentong
- Drakpa Gyaltsen (1147-1216)
- Tulku Dragpa Gyaltsen (1619-1656)
