= Testament of Ba =

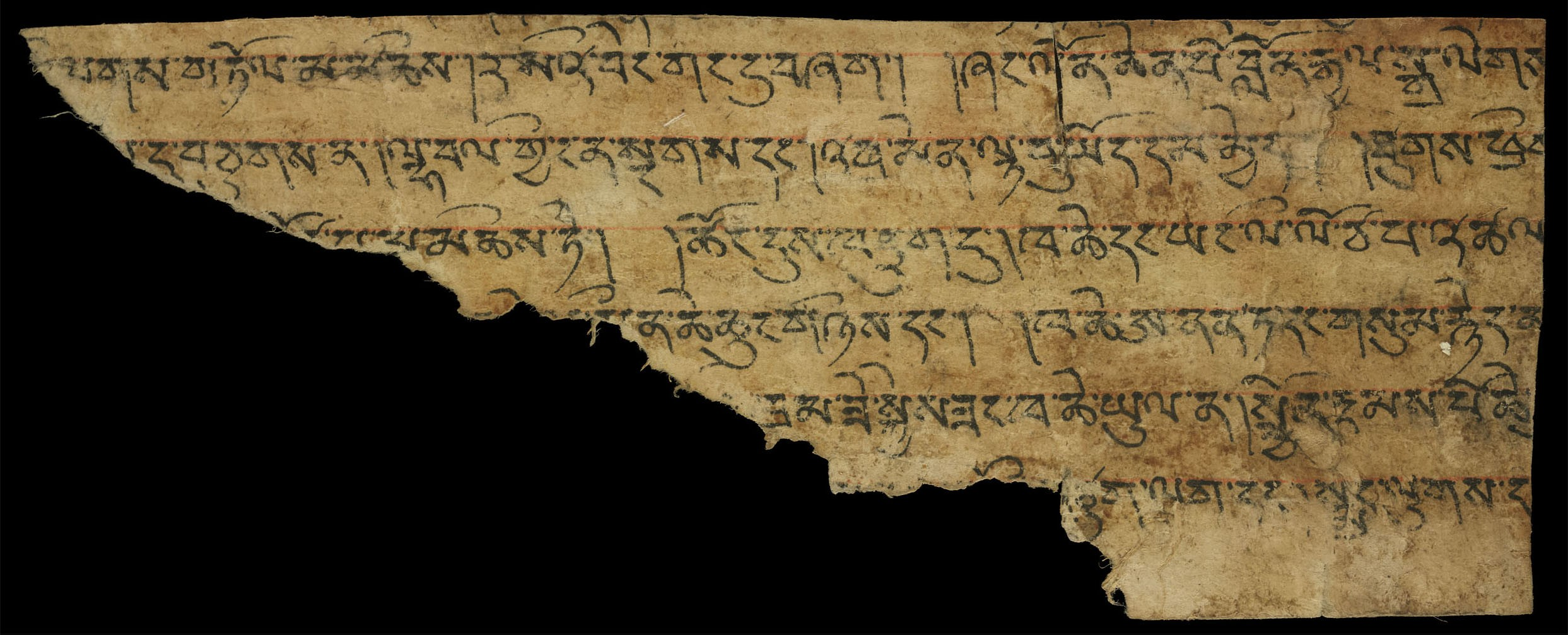
Fragment of the Testament of Ba at the British Library, with six lines of Tibetan script (Or.8210/S.9498A).

The Testament of Ba or the Chronicle of Ba(Tibetan དབའ་བཞེད or སྦ་བཞེད; Wylie transliteration: dba' bzhed or sba bzhed) is a Tibetan chronicle written in 8th century Classical Tibetan documenting the establishment of Tibetan Buddhism and the Vajrayana, Samye Monastery and the Samye Debate, and notable events and people in Tibet's history. Written during the Tibetan Empire period, it covers the reigns of kings Songsten Gampo, Trisong Detsen (r. 755–797/804), and the years after Rapalchen's reign. The monk Ba Salnang (Tibetan སྦ་གསལ་སྣང; Wylie transliteration: sba gsal snang) of the Ba Family was the main recorder of the Chronicle who used other scribes and members of the kings' courts.

In 2008, early versions of the text were said to have been discovered in London, where two manuscript fragments possibly dating to the 9th or 10th centuries are held by the British Library.

== Versions of the text ==
The Testament of Ba was transmitted in manuscript form over many centuries, and so many different recensions of the text have been located in the Dunhuang manuscripts, but not one single, canonical printed version. Scholars think they have identified two early versions of the text:

- A Lhasa manuscript in 31 folios discovered in Lhasa in 1997, titled Dba' bzhed (with a 'd' prefix to the Ba clan name), that is thought to be a revised copy of an 11th-century manuscript, and which was published in facsimile with an English translation in 2000;
- Three manuscripts titled Sba bzhed (with an 's' prefix to the Ba clan name), one of which dates to the 12th century, that were used as the basis of an edition published in Beijing in 1980.

The Testament of Ba is also widely quoted in earlier and in later Tibetan historiographical works, for example the Treasury of Knowledge (1863), the Scholar's Feast (mkhas pa'i dga' ston). The author of the Scholar's Feast calls the Testament the Rba bzhed (with an 'r' prefix to the Ba clan name), and refers to 'genuine', 'impure', 'large' and 'medium' versions of the text.

A later, expanded version of the Testament of Ba, titled Sba bzhed zhabs brtags pa (Supplemented Testament of Ba), was produced during the mid 14th century. A manuscript copy of this text was published with a summary in French by Rolf Stein in 1961.

While Tibetan scholars and even Jamgon Kongtrul in 1863 knew the Chronicle of Ba covered the events and people in the 8th century and before, western historians until 2009 thought that the Testament of Ba dated back to no earlier than the 11th or 12th century, and therefore its composition may not have been contemporaneous with the late 8th century events that it recorded.

In 2009 Sam van Schaik of the British Library realised that two Tibetan manuscript fragments had been mis-catalogued amongst the Chinese manuscripts of the Stein collection, and consequently previously overlooked by historians. These fragments are said to preserve a section of the Testament of Ba relating to the arrival of the Indian monk Śāntarakṣita, Khenpo of Nalanda University, to Lhasa:

- Or.8210/S.9498A (six lines)
- Or.8210/S.13683 (one line)

These two fragments allegedly came from the 'Library Cave' at Sachu, now Dunhuang, which was sealed in the early 11th century with all of the other known versions of the Testament of Ba. Van Schaik dates the fragments to the 9th or 10th centuries. The manuscripts in the caves were plundered by Aurel Stein and Paul Pelliot in 1908 and 1909, and taken without cataloguing to various countries, then and afterwards.

The translated text of the British Library's fragments contradict basic Tibetan history. Most notably, Santaraksita is honored by the king, who then sponsors his trip to Nepal as Padmasambhava is about to arrive. Ba Salnang, author of the Chronicle of Ba, collects Santaraksita from Nepal. While the fragments are similar to that of the Dba' bzhed manuscript discovered in Lhasa in 1997, the differences in the text suggest at minimum that they represent possibly a different recension of the Testament of Ba.

In contradiction to Tibetan history, van Schaik's says his translated fragments at the British Library indicate the king's subjects are concerned that the foreign monk may have brought evil spirits with him, and so Santarakṣita is confined in the Jokhang and interrogated for three months through an interpreter called Ananta. Another manuscript, the Lhasa manuscript, is said to soften van Schaik's language, since it politely asks Śāntarakṣita to stay at the Jokhang rather than having him forcibly confined there.

== Bibliography ==
- Stein, R. A. 1961. Une chronique ancienne de bSam-yas : sBa-bzed (édition du texte tibétain et résumé français). Paris: Bibliothèque de l'Institut des Hautes Études chinoises, Textes et Documents.
- Wangdu, Pasang, and Diemberger, Hildegard. 2000. dBa' bzhed: The Royal Narrative concerning the bringing of the Buddha's Doctrine to Tibet. Vienna: Verlag der Österreichischen Akademie der Wissenschaften. ISBN 978-3-7001-2956-1.

== See also ==
- Old Tibetan Annals
- Old Tibetan Chronicle
