= Trisong Detsen =

5th Tibetan Emperor and 38th King of Tibet (742-797)

Trisong Detsen ཁྲི་སྲོང་ལྡེ་བཙན
- Tsenpo

King of Tibet
- Reign: 755–797
- Predecessor: Tridé Tsuktsen
- Successor: Muné Tsenpo
- Regent: Mashang Drompakye
- Lönchen: list We Nangshar Sutsen; Gos Trisang Yalag; Chimshang Gyalsig Shuteng; Nganlam Takdra Lukhong; Nanam Shang Gyaltsen Lhanang
- Born: 742; Tibet
- Died: 797 (age 55); Lhasa, Tibet
- Burial: Trülri Tsuknang Mausoleum, Valley of the Kings in Tibet
- Consorts: Tsépongza Métokdrön; Chimza Lhamotsen; Kharchenza Chogyel; Droza Trigyel Motsen (aka Jangchup Jertsen); Poyöza Gyel Motsün; Yeshe Tsogyal
- Issue: Mutri Songpo; Muné Tsenpo; Mutik Tsenpo; Sadnalegs
Regnal name
- Trisong Detsen
- Dynasty: Yarlung
- Father: Mé Aktsom
- Mother: Nanamza Mangpodé Zhiteng
- Religion: Tibetan Buddhism

Trisong Detsen (Tibetan: ཁྲི་སྲོང་ལྡེ་བཙན, Wylie: khri srong lde btsan) was the 38th King (Tsenpo) of Tibet from 755 to 797, succeeding his father Tridé Tsuktsen. He was the second of the "Three Dharma Kings of Tibet" — Songtsen Gampo, Trisong Detsen, Ralpachen — honored for their pivotal roles in the introduction of Buddhism to Tibet and the establishment of the Nyingma school of Tibetan Buddhism. Sowa Rigpa or Traditional Tibetan medicine was developed during his reign. Trisong Detsen became one of Tibet's major rulers during its empire era, and a benefactor to Padmasambhava, to Shantarakshita, to his court, and to the founding of the Vajrayana.

By the end of his reign, he extended the Tibetan Empire beyond its previous borders, reset the borders between Tibet and the Tang dynasty in 783, and even shortly occupied the Tang capital at Chang'an in 763, where he installed an emperor. This was a reverse to an earlier trend Trisong Detsen inherited whereby the empire briefly declined somewhat from its extent under Songtsen Gampo, the founder of the empire. Some disintegration continued when, in 694, Tibet lost control of several cities in Turkestan and in 703, kingdoms in Nepal broke into rebellion while Arab forces had vied for influence along the western borderlands of the Tibetan Empire.

== Trisong Detsen as Buddhist patron ==
Trisong Detsen is very important to the history of Tibetan Buddhism and is one of the three 'Dharma Kings' (Tibetan:chö gyal) who helped to established Buddhism in Tibet. The Three Dharma Kings were Songtsen Gampo, Trisong Detsen, and Ralpachen.

The Kar-cun pillar erected by Tridé Songtsen (r. c. 800–815) says that during the reign of Trisong Detsen, "shrines of the Three Jewels were established by building temples at the centre and on the borders, Samye (Bsam-yas) in Brag-mar and so on".

Trisong Detsen became the king in 755, at the traditional young age of 13. His conversion to Buddhism took place in 762 at age 20. He invited Padmasambhava, Śāntarakṣita, Vimalamitra, and various other Indian masters to come to Tibet and spread the latest understanding of the Buddha's teachings. Padmasambhava tamed the obstructors and designed the plans while Santaraksita helped to construct Samye Monastery as the first monastery in Tibet.

Seven Tibetans were initiated as monks by Santaraksita in 779, some of whom reportedly consisted of former army members. This occurred while a vast translation project was being undertaken on the Buddhist scriptures and commentaries written in Pali and Sanskrit and translated into Classical Tibetan.

The Princess of Karchen became known as Yeshe Tsogyal, who was one of the consorts of Trisong Detsen, and who became a great master after studying with Padmasambhava. A daughter of the king, Princess Pema Sal (c.758-766) died young, but is believed to have incarnated later as a Terton, among them Longchenpa.

=== Chan Buddhism ===
Different from the Indo-Buddhist traditions that became the Vajrayana of Tibetan Buddhism embraced by Tibet and its king, were the Chinese Buddhist traditions. The first documented dissemination of Chan Buddhism to Tibet, chronicled in what has become known as the Chronicle of Ba (Statements of the Sba Family), occurred in about 761 when Trisong Detsen sent a party to the Yizhou region to receive the teachings of Kim Hwasang, a Korean Chan master, who was encountered in Sichuan. The party received teachings and three Chinese texts from Kim, who died soon after.

Trisong Detsen patronised a second party to China in 763. This second expedition was headed by a high minister, Ba Salsnan. There is scholarly dissent about whom Salsnan encountered in Yizhou. Early scholarship considered Kim, but this had been revised to Baotang Wuzhu (714-774), head and founder of Baotang Monastery in Chengdu. Both Kim and Baotang Wuzhu were of the same school of Chan, the East Mountain Teaching.

== Debates ==
Trisong Detsen, hosted a famous two-year debate from 792 to 794, known in Western scholarship as the "Council of Lhasa" (although it took place at Samye at quite a distance from Lhasa) outside the capital. He sponsored a Dharma debate between the Chan Buddhist Moheyan, who represented the third documented wave of Chan dissemination in Tibet, and the scholar Kamalaśīla, a student of Śāntarakṣita. Effectively the debate was between the Chinese and Indian Buddhist traditions as they were represented in Tibet.

Sources differ about both the nature of the debate as well as the victor. Stein (1972: p.66–67) holds that Kamalaśīla disseminated a "gradualist approach" to enlightenment, consisting of purificatory sādhanā such as cultivating the pāramitās. Kamalaśīla's role was to ordain Tibetans as Buddhist monks and propagate Buddhist philosophy as it had flourished in India. Stein (1972: p.66–67) holds that Kamalaśīla was victorious in the debate and that Tri Songdetsen sided with Kamalaśīla.

=== Stupa construction ===
Trisong Detsen is also traditionally associated with the construction of Boudhanath in the Kathmandu Valley in Nepal.

The role of Padmasambhava on the other hand was to establish the teaching of Buddhist Tantra in Tibet. During the reign of Trisong Detsen the combined efforts of Padmasambhava, Śāntarakṣita and Kamalaśīla established both the Indian Buddhist philosophical interpretation and Buddhist tantra in Tibet.

== Political and military activities ==
In 763, Trisong Detsen sent an army of 200,000 men to the border with the Chinese Tang dynasty, defeating the forces there and then continuing on to take Chang'an, the Tang capital, forcing Emperor Daizong of Tang to flee the capital. In 783, a peace treaty was negotiated between China and Tibet, giving Tibet all lands in present-day Qinghai.

He also formed an alliance with Nanzhao in 778, joining forces to attack China in modern Sichuan. However, Nanzhao launched the Battle of Shenchuan to break away from Tibet in 794 and restored the alliance with China.

Trisong Detsen next sought to expand westward, reaching the Amu Darya and threatening the Abbasid Caliph, Harun ar-Rashid. The Caliph was concerned enough to establish an alliance with China. Trisong Detsen would be preoccupied with Arab wars in the west while taking pressure off his Chinese opponents to the east and north until his rule ended in 797.

== Retirement, death and succession ==
Trisong Detsen had three sons: Mutri, Muné Tsenpo (also known as Murub), and Mutik Tsenpo (also known as Sadnalegs). The eldest son, Mutri Tsenpo, died early.

When Trisong Detsen retired in 797 to live at the palace at Zungkar and write dharma texts, he passed the throne to his second son, Muné Tsenpo who achieved many spiritual and temporal objectives in his brief reign of a year and a half. The Testament of Ba states Muné Tsenpo insisted that his father's funeral be performed according to Buddhist rather than traditional rites.

It is said that Mune Tsenpo was poisoned by his mother, who was jealous of his beautiful wife.

The throne then passed to Mutik Tsenpo, whose sons included Ralpachen and Ü Dum Tsen. Tibetan sources and the Old Book of Tang agree that Mune Tsenpo had no heirs, and the throne was passed to the third brother, Sadnalegs, who was on the throne by 804 CE.

Regnal titles
Preceded by Me Agtsom	Emperor of Tibet r. 755 – 797 or 804	Succeeded by Muné Tsenpo
