= Samye =

First Tibetan Buddhist monastery near Lhasa, Tibet

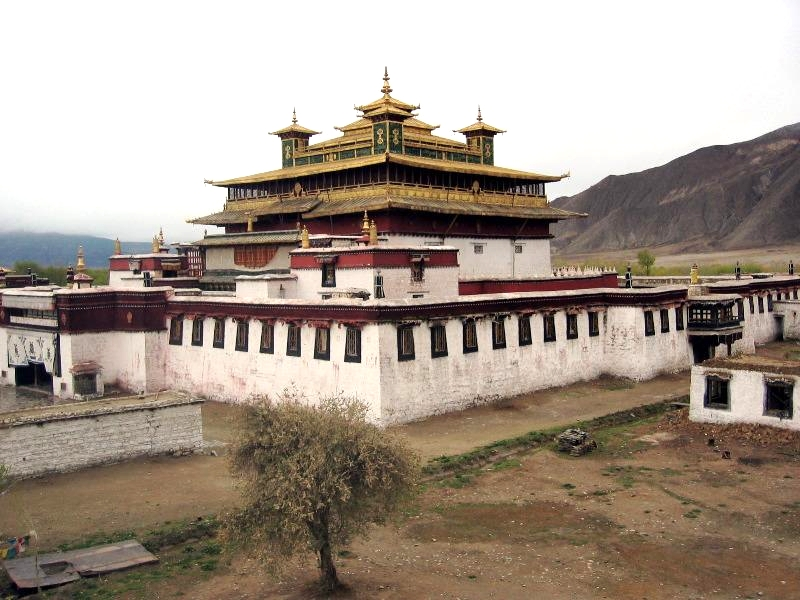
- The main building of the Samye Monastery

- Location within Tibet

Religion
- Affiliation: Tibetan Buddhism
- Sect: Nyingma

Location
- Location: Lhokha in Chimpu Valley, Lhasa Prefecture, Tibet Autonomous Region, People's Republic of China
- Coordinates: 29°19′31.80″N 91°30′13.32″E

Architecture
- Founder: King Trisong Deutsen
- Established: 779; 1247 years ago
- Groundbreaking: 763 by Shantarakshita, then 767 by Padmasambhava
- Completed: 779

Samye Monastery (Tibetan: བསམ་ཡས་, Wylie: bsam yas, Chinese: 桑耶寺), full name Samye Migyur Lhundrub Tsula Khang (Wylie: Bsam yas mi ’gyur lhun grub gtsug lag khang) and Shrine of Unchanging Spontaneous Presence, is the first Tibetan Buddhist and Nyingma monastery built in Tibet, during the reign of King Trisong Detsen. Khenpo Shantarakshita began construction in 763, and Tibetan Vajrayana founder Guru Padmasambhava tamed the local spirits before its completion in 767. The first Tibetan monks were ordained there in 779. Samye was destroyed during the Cultural Revolution then rebuilt after 1988.

Samye Monastery is located in the Chimpu valley (Mchims phu), south of Lhasa, next the Hapori mountain along the greater the Yarlung Valley. The site is in the present administrative region of Gra Nang or Drananga Lhokha.

== History ==
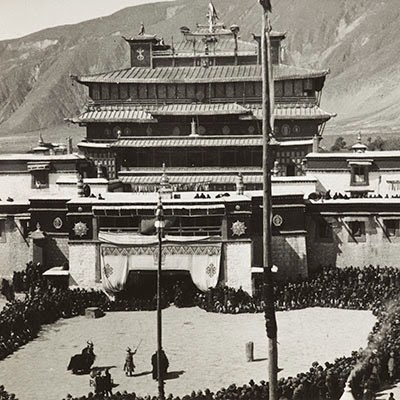
View of Samye Monastery's court, photographed in 1936 by Hugh Edward Richardson.

The Testament of Ba provides the earliest date for the construction of the temple, recording that the foundation was set in the "hare year" (either 763 or 775) and the completion and consecration of the main shrine taking place in the "sheep year" (either 767 or 779). The Blue Annals of 1476 use later dates of 787 and 791, but those dates contradict the historical dates of Shantaraksita's ordination of monks in 779, and his arrival in 763. All accounts concur that the patron was King Trisong Detsen.

=== Design ===
The building plan of Samye Monastery follows the arrangement of a mandala depicting the Buddhist cosmos, which is also the source for the design of Odantapuri, in present-day Bihar, India. The arrangement of the monastery had a main shrine building in the middle, enclosed by four symmetrical stupas of four different colors, and the whole surrounded by a circular wall with four openings at the cardinal points representing the Buddhist universe as a three dimensional mandala. This idea is found in a number of temples of the period in South East Asia and East Asia such as the Tōdai-ji in Japan. As at the Tōdai-ji, the Samye temple is dedicated to Vairocana. A seminal text of Vairocana is the Mahavairocana Tantra, composed in India in the seventh century and translated into Tibetan and Chinese soon after.

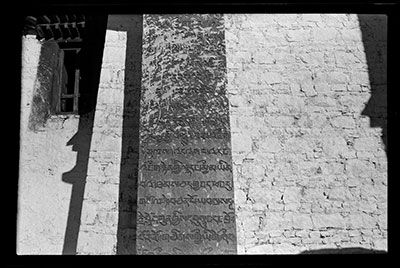
Detail of the inscribed pillar at Samye Monastery, photographed in 1949 by Hugh Edward Richardson. University of Oxford. Available at: http://tibet.prm.ox.ac.uk/photo_2001.59.13.38.1.html

The Samye Pillar, རྡོ་རིང་ and its inscription The few accessible Tibetan historical records are pillar inscriptions of treaties and events, found in Lhasa and elsewhere. Samye Monastery has a stone pillar belonging to the eighth century proper—but not carrying an actual date— (རྡོ་རིང་) preserved in front of Samye. The pillar records the building of Samye and other monasteries at Lhasa and Brag Mar, and records that the king, ministers and other nobles had made solemn oaths to preserve and protect the endowments of the monasteries. The term used for these endowments is 'necessities' or 'meritorious gifts' (Tib. ཡོ་བྱད་ Sanskrit deyadharma).

The Samye bell inscription A second dynastic record at Samye is on the large bronze bell in the entrance to the monastery. This gives an account of the making of the bell by one of the queens of King Trisong Detsen. The text has been translated as follows: "Queen Rgyal mo brtsan, mother and son, made this bell in order to worship the Three Jewels of the ten directions. And pray that, by the power of that merit, Lha Btsan po Khri Srong lde brtsan, father and son, husband and wife, may be endowed with the harmony of the sixty melodious sounds, and attain supreme enlightenment."

== Samye Monastery's founding ==
According to the Testament of Ba and other accounts, such as that compiled by Bsod-nams-rgyal-mtshan (1312–1374), the Indian scholar and philosopher Khenpo Śāntarakṣita began constructing the monastery c.763 after accepting the king's invitation to come to Tibet, where he also taught his synthesis of Madhyamaka philosophical thought. Finding the Samye site auspicious, he set about to build a structure there. However, the building would always collapse after reaching a certain stage. Terrified, the construction workers believed that there was a demon or obstructive spirit in a nearby river making trouble.

Following his advice, the king invited Shantaraksita's contemporary Padmasambhava to come to Tibet, and he arrived from the Nepali border and was able to subdue the energetic problems obstructing the building of Samye. According to the 5th Dalai Lama, Padmasambhava performed the Vajrakilaya dance and enacted the rite of namkha to assist Trisong Detsen and Śāntarakṣita clear away obscurations and hindrances in the building of Samye:

The great religious master Padmasambhava performed this dance in order to prepare the ground for the Samye Monastery and to pacify the malice of the lha [local mountain god spirits] and srin [malevolent spirits] in order to create the most perfect conditions." He went on to say that after Padmasambhava consecrated the ground, he erected a thread-cross — a web colored thread woven around two sticks — to catch evil. Then the purifying energy of his dance forced the malevolent spirits into a skull mounted on top of a pyramid of dough. His tantric dance cleared away all the obstacles, enabling the monastery to be built by 767. This pacifying dance was reinforced by the construction of four Vajrakilaya stupas, as monuments honoring the ritual kilya (purba) daggers, at the cardinal points of the monastery where they would prevent demonic forces from entering the sacred grounds.)

At the time in which Samye Monastery was built, it automatically became a Nyingma school monastery since this original school of Tibetan Buddhism was the only school, while the king, queens, students and subjects all belonged to the Nyingma school sangha. Padmasambhava's Tantra Vajrayana thus became the third vehicle of Buddhism, after the Sutra Mahayana.

Author Ellen Pearlman suggests a chart of the origin of the institution of the Nechung Oracle as it relates to Samye Monastery:

When Padmasambhava consecrated Samye Monastery with the Vajrakilaya dance, he tamed the local spirit protector, Pehar Gyalpo, and bound him by oath to become the head of the entire hierarchy of Buddhist protective spirits. Pehar, later known as Dorje Drakden, became the principal protector of the Dalai Lamas, manifesting through the Nechung Oracle.

== The Great Samye Debate ==
One of the important events in the history of Samye occurred after Shantaraksita passed and a dispute began among his followers, which grew into a debate between the major Buddhist schools. Kamalasila represented Indian Buddhist theory and Hosang Mahayana represented Chinese Buddhist theory. The debate was hosted by Trisong Detsen in the early 790s. A source provides a five-year range when Kamalasila and Mahayana (Moheyan of the East Mountain Teaching of Chan Buddhism) may have debated at Samye in Tibet. The outcome was that Kamalasila who was representing Shantaraksita's philosophical thought won the debate, as was decided by the king.

As is well known, the fate of Chan in Tibet was said to have been decided in a debate at the Samye monastery.

Jeffrey Broughton identifies the Chinese and Tibetan nomenclature of Moheyan's teachings and identifies them principally with the China's East Mountain Teaching:

Mo-ho-yen's teaching in Tibet as the famed proponent of the all-at-once gate can be summarized as "gazing-at-mind" ([Chinese:] k'an-hsin... [...] [Tibetan:] sems la bltas) and "no examining" ([Chinese:] pu-kuan [...] [Tibetan:] myi rtog pa) or "no-thought no-examining" ([Chinese:] pu-ssu pu-kuan... [...] [Tibetan:] myi bsam myi rtog). "Gazing-at-mind" is an original Northern (or East Mountain Dharma Gate) teaching. As will become clear, Poa-t'ang and the Northern Ch'an dovetail in the Tibetan sources. Mo-ho-yen's teaching seems typical of late Northern Ch'an. Mo-ho-yen arrived on the central Tibetan scene somewhat late in comparison to the Ch'an transmissions from Szechwan.

A commemorative annual cham dance is held at Kumbum Monastery in Amdo (Ch. Qinghai) when the great debate of the two principal debators or dialecticians, Mahayana (Moheyan) and Kamalaśīla is narrated and depicted.

== Influences ==
The 18th century Puning Temple built by the Qianlong Emperor of Qing China in Chengde, Hebei was modeled after Samye.

== Architectural features of the monastery and their history ==
Samye Monastery is laid out on the shape of a giant mandala; in its center lies the main temple representing the legendary Mount Meru. Other buildings stand at the corners and cardinal points of the main temple, representing continents and other features of tantric Buddhist cosmology. The three-storied main building has been designed with the first floor in Indian style, the second in Chinese style and the third in Khotanese (Tibetan) style. The original building was completed in 780 CE.

In corners are 4 chörtens - white, red, green (or blue) and black. There are 8 main temples:

- Dajor ling བརྡ་སྦྱོར་གླིང་ (brda sbyor gling)
- Dragyar ling སྒྲ་བསྒྱར་གླིང་ (sgra bsgyar gling)
- Bétsa ling བེ་ཙ་གླིང་ (be tsa gling)
- Jampa ling བྱམས་པ་གླིང་ (byams pa gling)
- Samten ling བསམ་གཏན་གླིང་ (bsam gtan gling)
- Natsok ling སྣ་ཚོགས་གླིང་ (sna tshogs gling)
- Düdül ling བདུད་འདུལ་གླིང་ (bdud 'dul gling)
- Tamdrin ling རྟ་མགྲིན་གླིང་ (rta mgrin gling)

The original buildings have long disappeared. They have been badly damaged several times — by civil war in the 11th century, fires in the mid 17th century and in 1826, an earthquake in 1816, and in the 20th century, particularly during the Cultural Revolution. As late as the late 1980s pigs and other farm animals were allowed to wander through the sacred buildings. Heinrich Harrer quoted his own words he said to the 14th Dalai Lama of what he saw in 1982 from his airplane en route to Lhasa,

"On our approach, in the Brahmaputra valley, the first terrible sight we saw confirmed all the bad news about Tibet's oldest monastery, Samye; it was totally destroyed. One can still make out the outer wall, but none of the temples or stupas survives."

Each time it has been rebuilt, and today, largely due to the efforts of Choekyi Gyaltsen, 10th Panchen Lama from 1986 onward, it is again an active monastery and important pilgrimage and tourist destination. Samye still preserves the original design of Trisong Detsen the 8th century Tibetan monarch (Van Schaik 2013:36).

== Recent events ==
=== Imprisonment and suicide ===
In 2009, the Tibetan Centre for Human Rights and Democracy (TCHRD) reports that after a protest held on 15 March 2008 at the Samye government administrative headquarters in Dranang County, nine monks studying at Samye Monastery had been sentenced to prison terms varying from two to fifteen years, for participating. The monks were joined by hundreds of Tibetans demanding religious freedom, human rights for Tibetans and the return of the Dalai Lama to Tibet. The monks and others were held at the Lhoka Public Security Bureau (PSB) Detention Centre.

The TCHRD also reported that on 19 March 2008, a visiting scholar from Dorje Drak Monastery, Namdrol Khakyab, who claimed responsibility for organizing the 15 March protest had committed suicide, leaving a note speaking of unbearable suppression by the Chinese regime, citing the innocence of other monks of the monastery, and taking full responsibility for the protest.

=== Statue of Padmasambhava dismantled by Chinese Authorities ===
In May 2007, a 30 ft (9 metre) gold and copper plated statue of Guru Rinpoche, known as Padmasambhava, at Samye Gompa, and apparently funded by two Chinese devotees from Guangzhou in the southern Chinese province of Guangdong, was reportedly demolished by Chinese authorities.

== See also ==
- Cham dance

== Gallery ==
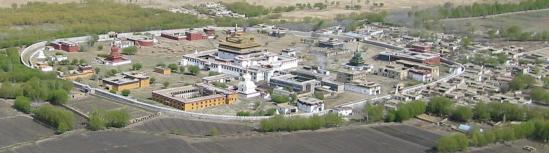
A view of Samye from above

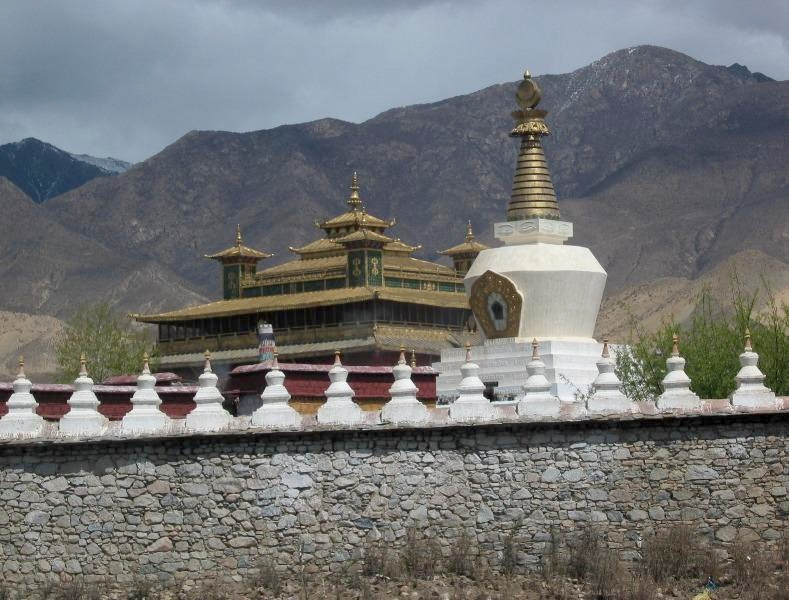
The protective wall of Samye

== See also ==
- Tibetan Buddhist Institute
