= Sino-Tibetan relations =

Sino-Tibetan relations may refer to:

- Tang–Tibet relations
- Song–Tibet relations
- Tibet under Yuan rule
- Ming–Tibet relations
- Tibet under Qing rule
- Tibet during the Republic of China (1912–1949), see Tibet (1912–1951)
- Tibet under the People's Republic of China rule
