= Battle of Dafei River =

670 battle

- Part of Tibetan conquest of the Tarim Basin
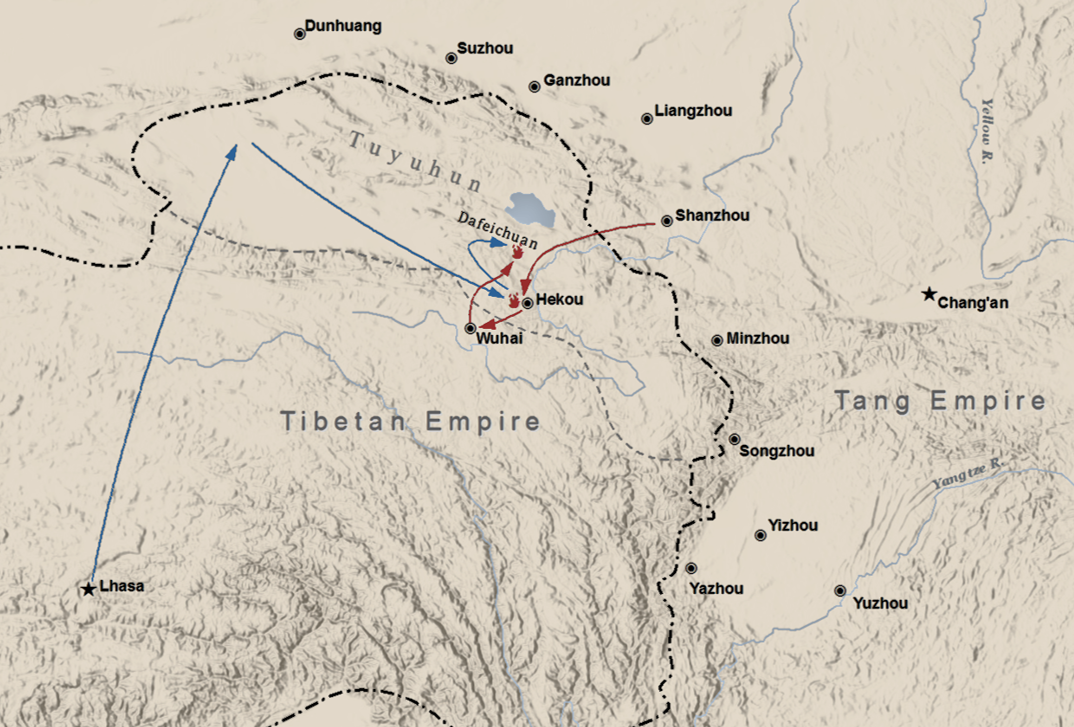
- Battle of Dafei River
Date	670 CE
Location	near Qinghai Lake
Result	Tibetan victory

Belligerents
Tibetan Empire	Tang dynasty

Commanders and leaders
Gar Trinring Tsendro	Xue Rengui; Ashina Daozi; Guo Daifeng

Strength
Unknown	50,000-100,000

Casualties and losses
Unknown	Heavy

The Battle of Dafei River (Chinese: 大非川之戰) was fought in mid-670 between the forces of the Tang dynasty and the Tibetan Empire, for control over the Tarim Basin (the "Anxi Protectorate" in Chinese parlance). In 669, the Tibetan Empire invaded and conquered the Tuyuhun kingdom of Qinghai, which was a tributary state and important ally to the Tang dynasty. To help Tuyuhun restore its regime, Emperor Gaozong of Tang launched the campaign against Tibet. The Tang general, Xue Rengui, left his slower-moving baggage train and 20,000 soldiers under Guo Daifeng behind and advanced with the rest to the Qinghai Lake. The Tibetans attacked and captured the Tang baggage train before defeating Xue's own column at the Dafei River (Dafeichuan, 大非川). In the aftermath of the battle the Tang court relocated the Anxi Protectorate capital from Kucha to the safer city of Turfan and Tibet would rule the area for the next twenty years. Chinese forces retook the territory in 692.

== See also ==
- Sino-Tibetan relations during the Tang dynasty
