= Jeff Fuchs =

Canadian explorer, mountaineer and writer

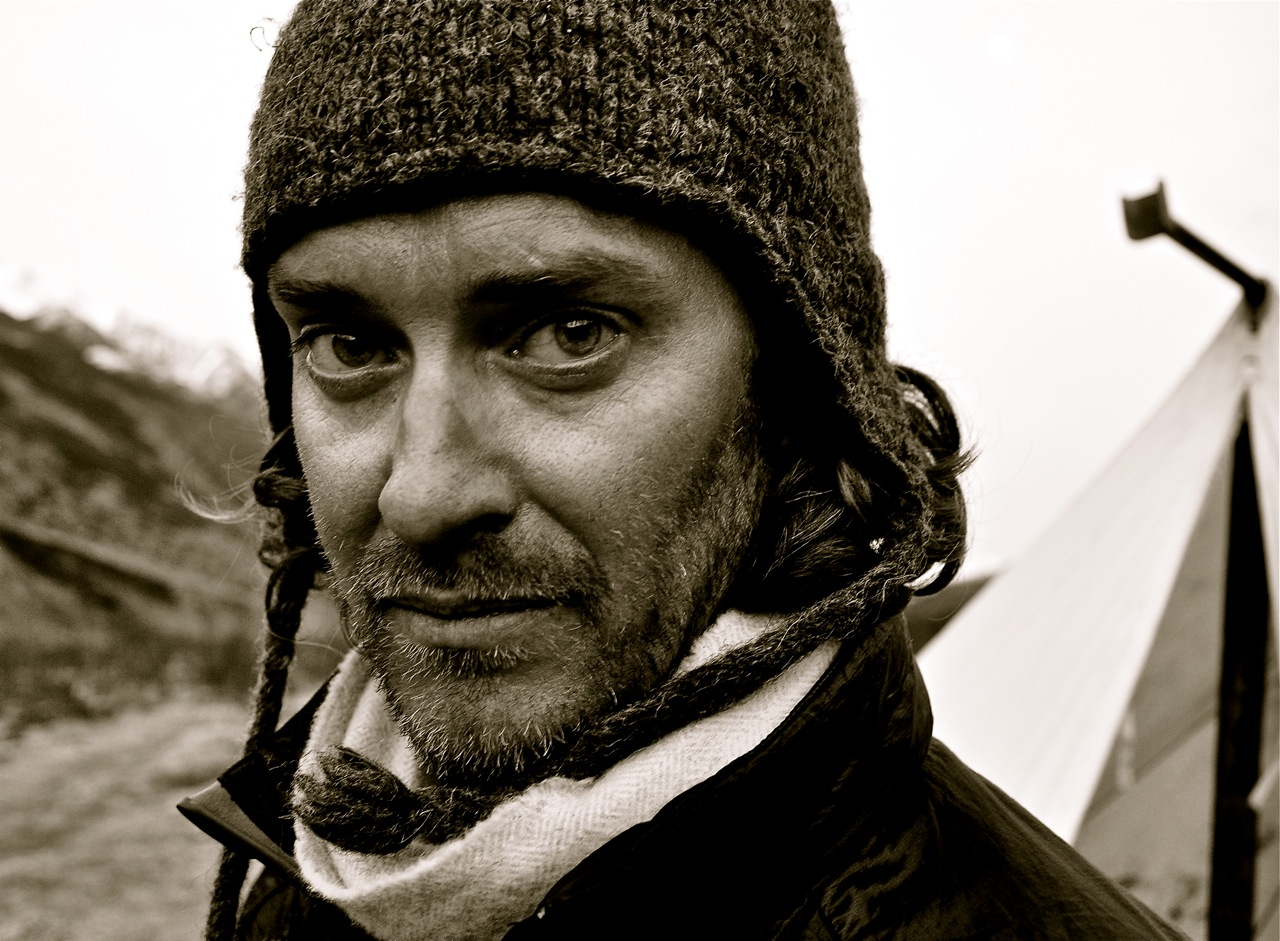
Portrait taken near Amne Machin on Salt Road (Tsa'lam) expedition, Qinghai, May 2011

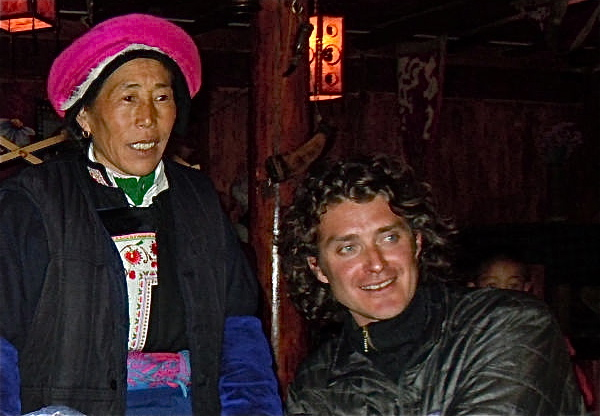
Photo taken in Zhongdian, northwestern Yunnan, March 2011

Jeff Fuchs is a Canadian explorer, mountaineer and writer. He gained prominence with his successful bid to become the first westerner to trek the entire Yunnan–Tibet Ancient Tea Horse Road, stretching almost six thousand kilometers through the Himalayas and a dozen cultures, documented in the book The Ancient Tea Horse Road: Travels with the Last of the Himalayan Muleteers (2008). He is also the acting Asia-Editor-at-Large for Outpost Magazine.

== Biography ==
Fuchs is a Canadian citizen of English–Hungarian heritage, born in Ottawa, Ontario, Canada. As a child he spent considerable time in Switzerland, where a staunch love of the mountains and climbing were established in him. Fuchs graduated from Dawson College in Montreal with a degree in commercial fine-art photography. He is fluent in several languages, notably Mandarin and Tibetan. He divides his time between Canada, Shangri-La County, China, and Europe.

Fuchs has been published in World Geographic, Spanish Geographical Society, New Ideas, Outdoor Exploration, New Traveler, Silkroad Foundation, Outpost magazine, Kyoto Journal and The South China Morning Post among others.

He was an invited speaker 1st Annual North American Tea Conference in October 2010, to discuss the origins of tea and tea's ancient birthplace in southern Yunnan. Jeff Fuchs joined with WildChina as a tour group operator for a series of trips along the Tea Horse Road beginning in late 2010. Fuchs is a current member of the Explorers Club. He is also Templar Food's global tea ambassador sourcing and submitting blog posts from throughout Asia.

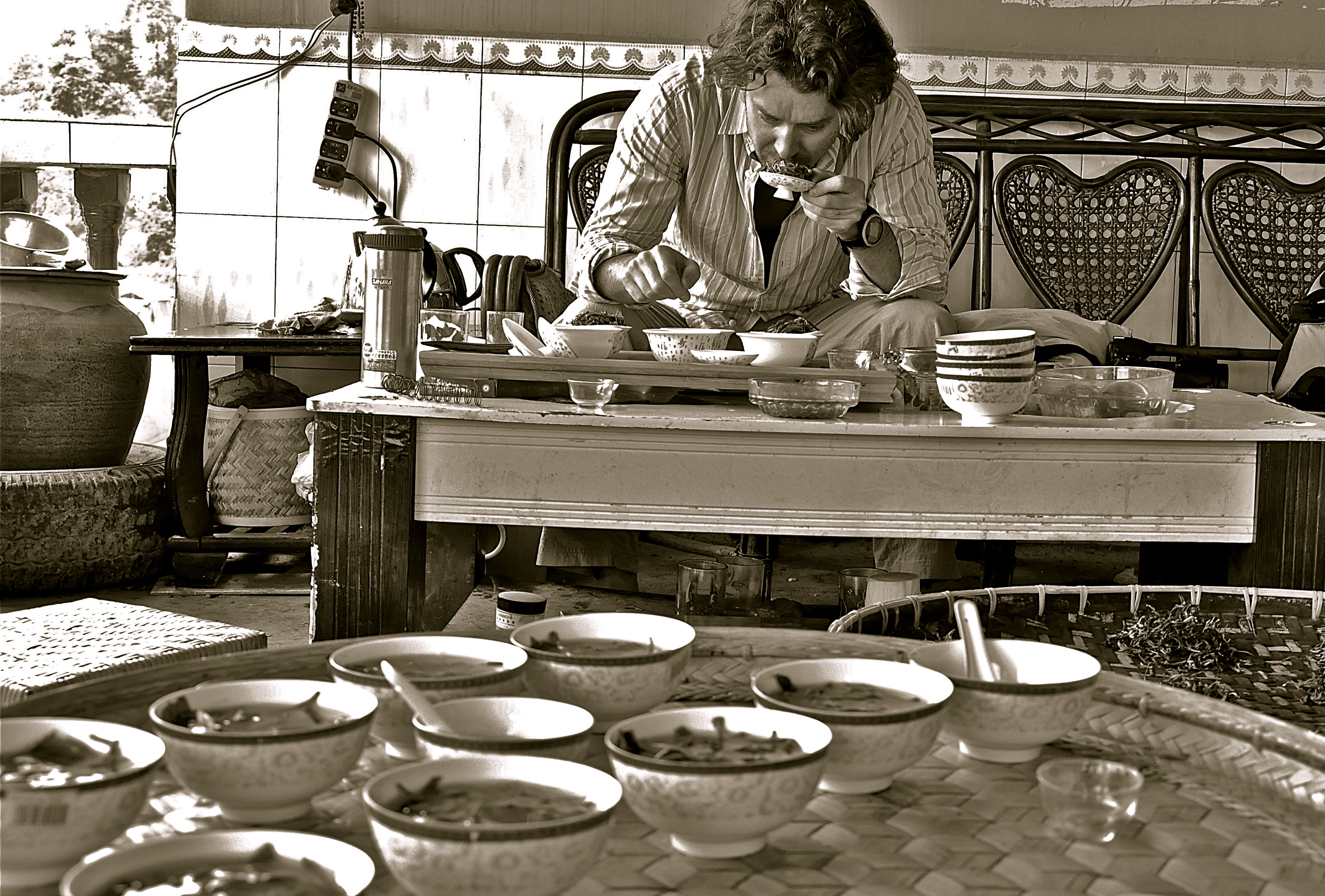
Jeff Fuchs tests tea in southern Yunnan province, home of the oldest tea trees on the planet and home to the famed Puer tea

== Exploration ==
The relationship between mountains, indigenous cultures, and tea has informed much of Fuchs' work, with a particular focus on Asia. After considerable time spent between the Himalayas and Southwestern China, he became compelled by the people and their narratives surrounding the old tea caravans. This interest culminated in a journey to retrace the path of the world's highest ancient trade route, from the perspective of the first Westerner to do so. Fuchs brought due attention to this story in his book The Ancient Tea Horse Road: Travels with the Last of the Himalayan Muleteers (2008), where he documents the 6000 km, 7.5 month journey.

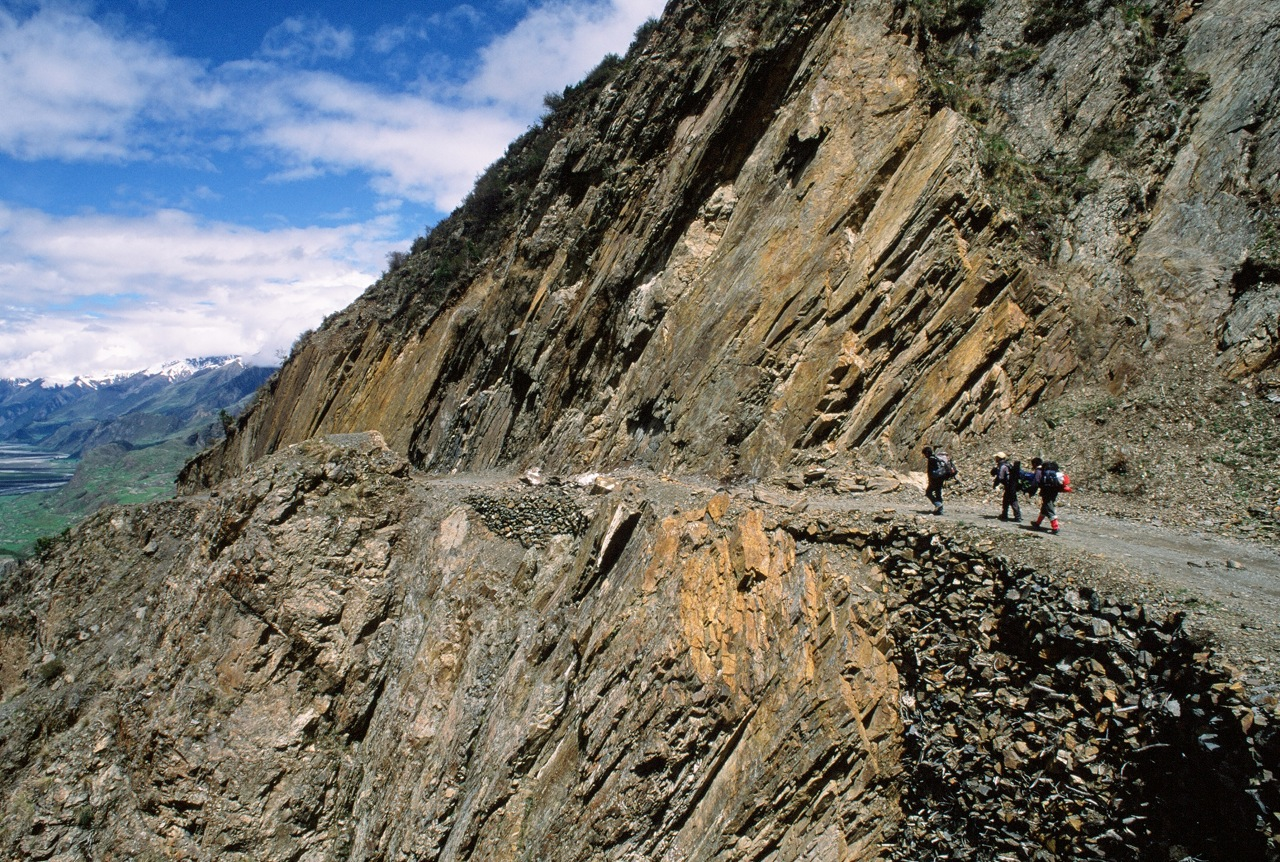
The team treks along a remote portion of the Tea Horse Road deep in the Himalayas without the aid of pack animals

Apart from being the first western explorer to have traveled both main arteries of the Ancient Tea Horse Road, Fuchs also spends considerable time in isolated regions documenting the changing face of culture and recording the oral traditions as passed on by elders. One of his most well-known articles appeared in Outpost documenting a three-week stay at almost 4500 meters with a community of the famed and feared Tibetan nomadic Khampas in eastern Tibet (Kham).

Fuchs led a first-ever western exploration of the nomadic salt road in southern Qinghai province. Known as the Tsalam the route was used by Tibetan nomads to access salt from some of the highest salt lakes on the planet. Along with Michael Kleinwort, the two undertook the journey in May 2011 spending a month tracing some of the most remote portions of the Tibetan Plateau. For his efforts Fuchs was awarded the WildChina Explorer Grant for 2011 for promoting sustainable and off-the-beaten-track exploration.

In February 2012, Fuchs led the two-week 'Kawa Karpo Expedition' tracing a previously unexplored portion of the Tea Horse Road on a route stretching from Shangri-La in northwest Yunnan province to the 4800 metre Sho La pass north of the sacred Kawa Karpo mountain range in northwestern Yunnan. Fuchs was joined on his journey by Bill Roberts of ZoomerMedia and Roberto Gibbons Gomez on the expedition which was sponsored by Outpost magazine and Revo Sunglasses.

Jeff Fuchs has spoken extensively at secondary schools, universities, academic organizations and public lectures throughout North America, Asia and Europe. Based on his first-hand experience with indigenous cultures, Fuchs has urged contemporary audiences not to ignore ancient traditions and the importance of oral narratives in our society.

In recognition of his work with minority cultures Fuchs was awarded a grant from the famed Banff Centre to continue his written and photo documentation of Himalayan Culture. Fuchs was the opening night speaker to the Bookworm's Explore series in Beijing in 2012.

== Bibliography ==
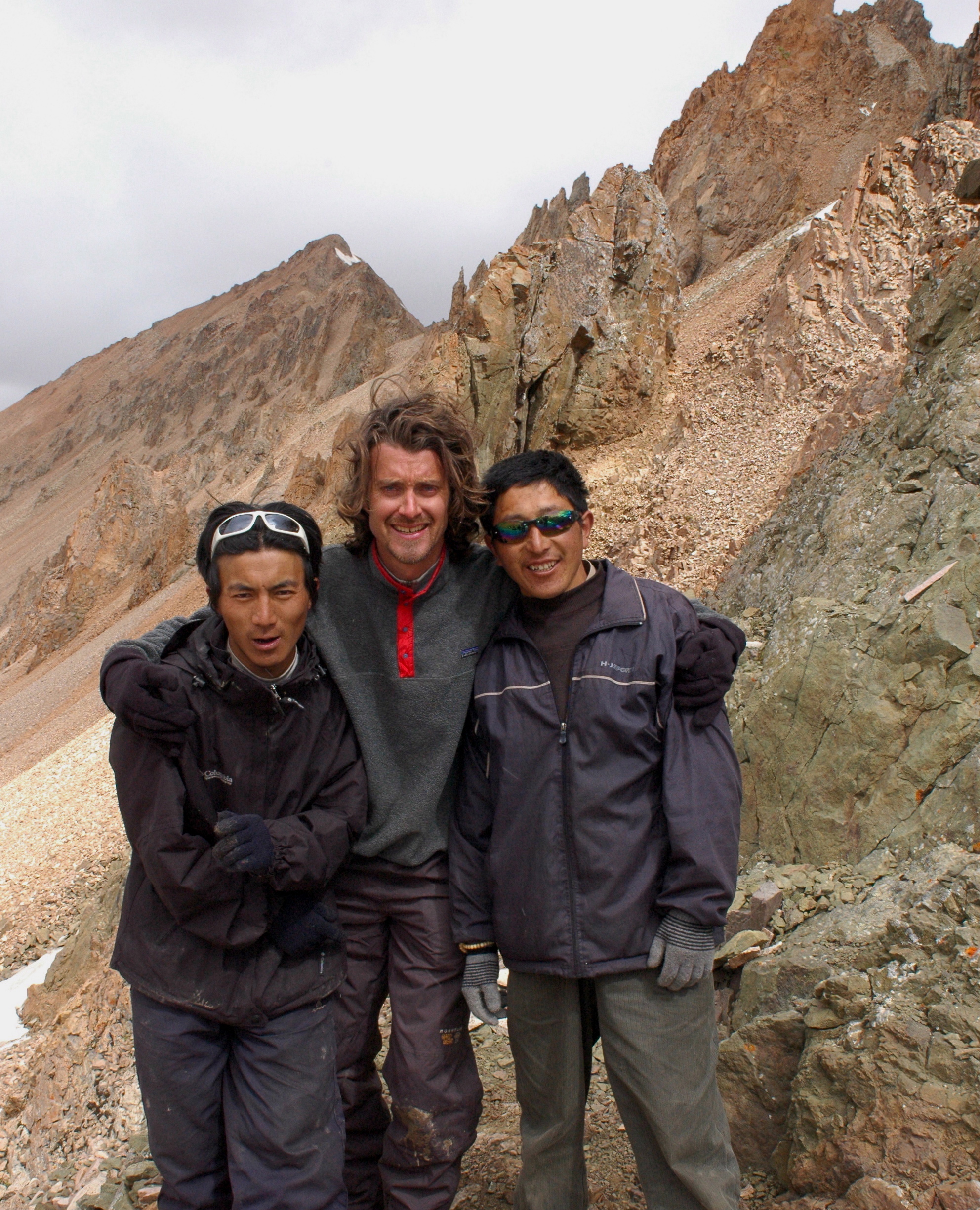
Jeff Fuchs with trekking partners atop the 5,400-meter Trola pass in central Tibet.

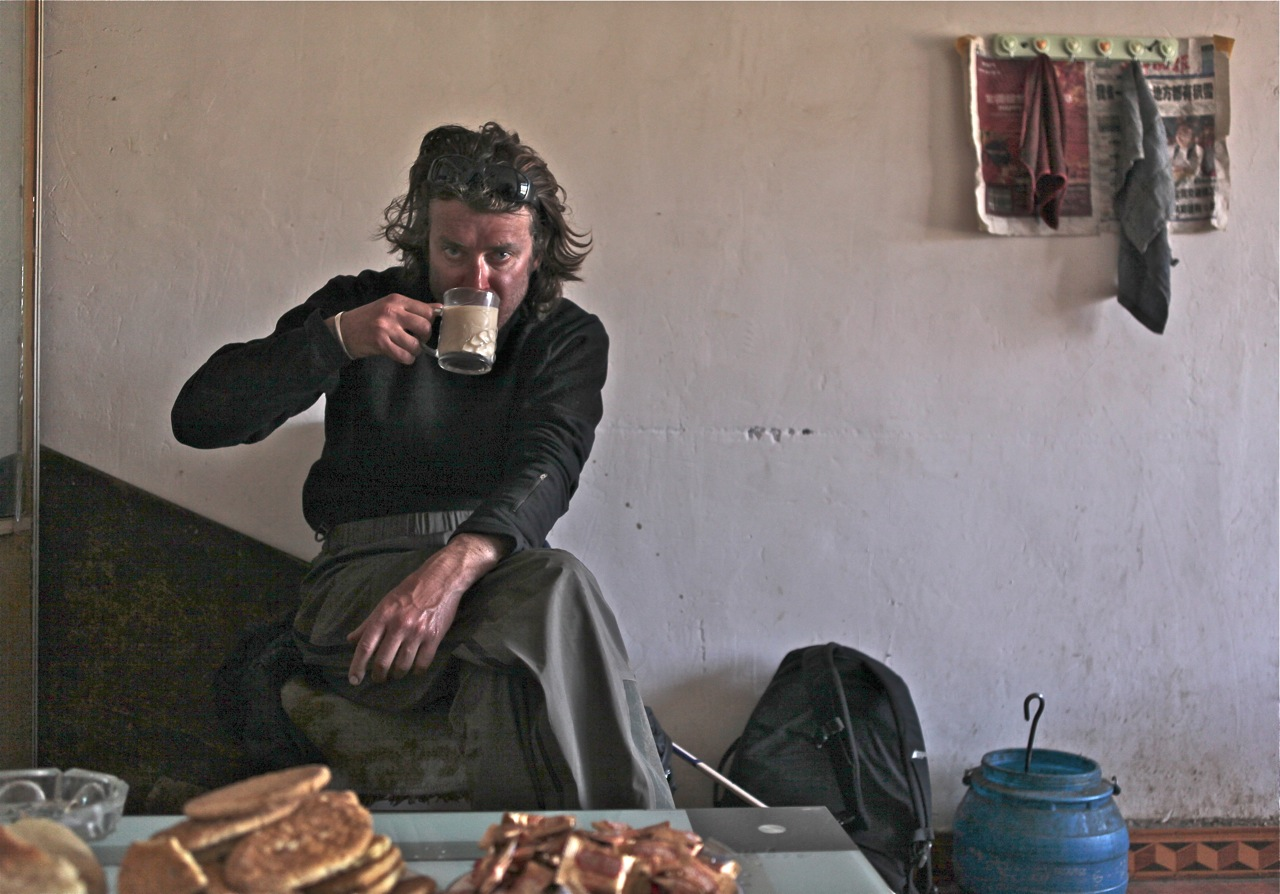

Books

- The Ancient Tea Horse Road: Travels with the Last of the Himalayan Muleteers (2008; Viking Canada). ISBN 978-0-670-06611-7

Articles

- "New Beginnings, Eternal Spice", "Outpost Magazine"
- "A picture and a thousand words". Toronto Star. 29 June 2008. Archived from the original on 30 June 2008.
- "The Simple Green" (part 2), The Tea Emporium, 22 Sep 2009
- "An Oolong Quest in Taiwan", e-Marginalia
- "The Tea Horse Road", Silk Road Journal, V.6, N.1 (Winter 2008)
- "Of Bonds, 'the Word' and Trade", Kyoto Journal No. 74
