= Tea Horse Road =

Network of caravan paths in southwestern China

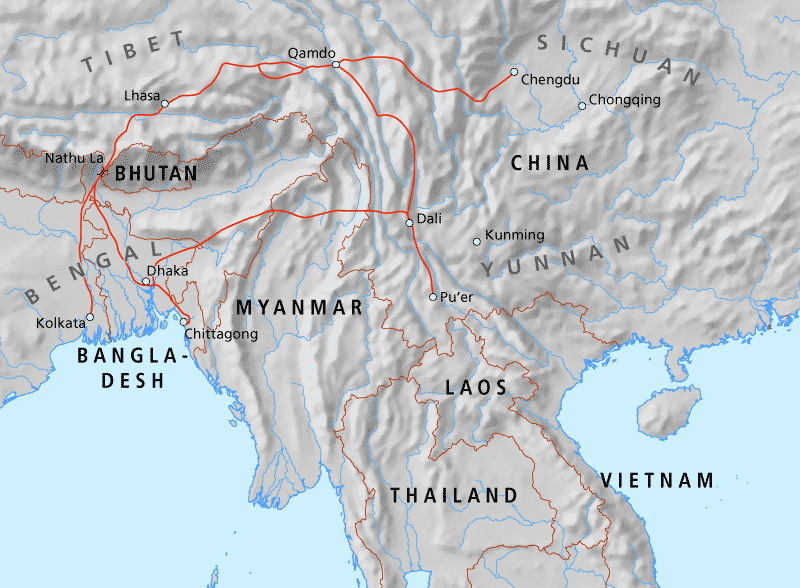
Map of the Tea-Horse route

The Tea Horse Road or Chamadao (simplified Chinese: 茶马道; traditional Chinese: 茶馬道), now generally referred to as the Ancient Tea Horse Road or Chamagudao (simplified Chinese: 茶马古道; traditional Chinese: 茶馬古道) was a network of caravan paths winding through the mountains of Sichuan, Yunnan and Tibet in Southwest China. This was also a tea trade route. It is also sometimes referred to as the "Southern Silk Road" or "Southwest Silk Road."

There are numerous surviving archaeological and monumental elements, including trails, bridges, way stations, market towns, palaces, staging posts, shrines and temples along the route.

"Ancient Tea Horse Road" is a historical concept with a specific meaning. It refers to a major traffic road formed by the exchange of tea and horses between Han and Tibet from the Tang and Song Dynasties to the Republic of China.

== Road classification ==
=== Shaanxi-Gansu Tea Horse Road ===
Shaanxi-Gansu Tea Horse Road (陕甘茶马古道) is the main road for tea in mainland China to travel west and exchange for horses. It is one of the main routes of the ancient Silk Road.

=== Tanggu Road ===
Beginning in the Han dynasty, the Tanggu Road (蹚古道) was formed by Shaanxi merchants and the ancient tea-horse market in the southwest frontier. Since the government of the Ming and Qing dynasties imposed government control on tea sales, tea sales were divided into regions, and the most prosperous tea and horse trading market was in Kangding.

=== Yunnan-Tibet Tea Horse Road ===
The Yunnan-Tibet Tea Horse Road (滇藏茶马古道) was formed in the late sixth century AD. It started from Yiwu and Pu'er in Xishuangbanna, the main tea producing area of Yunnan, and entered Tibet through today's Dali Bai Autonomous Prefecture, Lijiang City and Shangri-La, and went directly to Lhasa. Some were also re-exported from Tibet to India and Nepal, which was an important trade route between ancient China and South Asia.

=== Sichuan–Tibet Tea Horse Road ===
The Ancient Sichuan–Tibet Tea-Horse Road (川藏茶马古道) is a part of the Shaanxi–Kangding–Tibet Tea-Horse Road. It starts from Ya'an, the tea producing area of Yazhou in the east, passes through Dartsedo (now Kangding), reaches Lhasa, Tibet, in the west, and finally leads to Bhutan, Nepal and India. More than a thousand kilometres, it is an indispensable bridge and link between ancient Tibet and the mainland.

== History ==
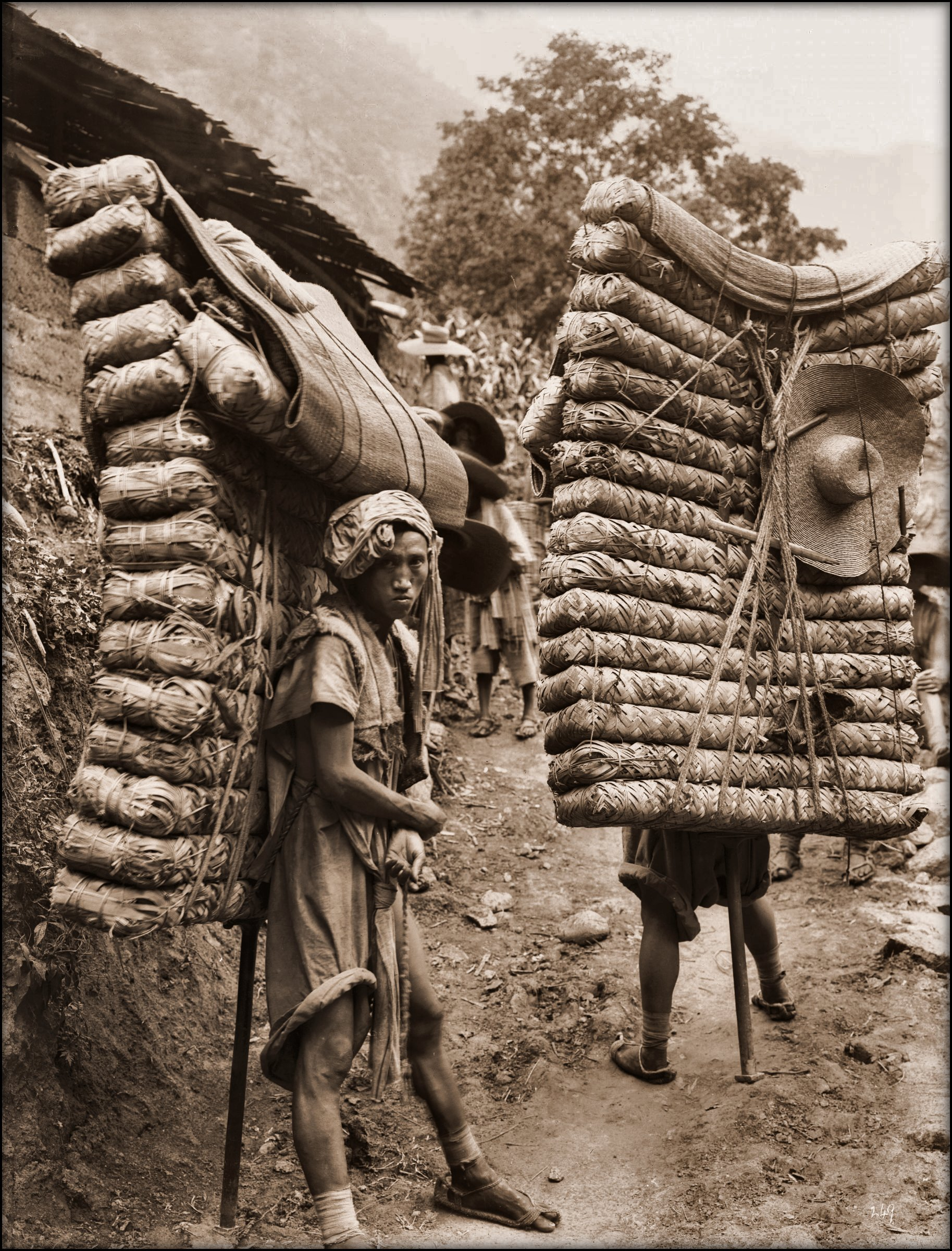
Men laden with tea, Sichuan Province, China, 1908, Ernest Henry Wilson

Sichuan and Yunnan are believed to be the first tea-producing regions in the world. The first records of tea cultivation suggest that tea was cultivated on Sichuan's Mount Mengding between Chengdu and Ya'an earlier than 65 BC. Ya'an has been an important hub of tea trading till the 20th century.

From around a thousand years ago, the Tea Horse Road become a trade link from Yunnan to Tibet; and to Central China via Sichuan Province. It is believed that it was through this trading network that tea (typically tea bricks) first spread across China and Asia from its origins in Pu'er county in Yunnan. The route earned the name because of the common trade of Tibetan ponies for Chinese tea, a practice dating back at least to the Song dynasty, when the sturdy horses were important for China to fight warring nomads in the north.

Both people and horses carried heavy loads. Tea porters sometimes carried over 60–90 kg (132-198 lb.), which was often more than their own body weight in tea. Porters were equipped with metal-tipped staffs, both for balance while walking and to help support the load while they rested, so they didn't need to lay the bales down (as illustrated in the photo).

In addition to tea, the mule caravans carried salt and silk products from Chengdu, notably Sichuan embroidery (shujin 蜀锦).

== Historic Site ==
The Ancient Tea Horse Road is a complex network of roads, of which some of the ancient tea horse roads and related historical sites in Sichuan, Yunnan and Guizhou provinces were listed as the seventh batch of China National Key Cultural Relics Protection Units on 5 March 2013. There are numerous cultural heritage sites listed as National Key Cultural Heritage Protection Units, including ancient road sites, post stations, shops, pagodas, bridges and piers, as well as related guild buildings, religious buildings, mining and metallurgical sites and kiln sites, cliff carvings and inscriptions in the ancient tea horse road network.

=== In Sichuan ===
The Ancient Tea Horse Road in Sichuan.

Name	Location	positioning	Description	Picture	Signpost
In Chengdu
Pingle Longshan ancient road	Pingle Town, Qionglai City	30°20′12″N 103°20′10″E	Located on the south side of Pingle Ancient Town, within the South Silk Road Ruins Scenic Area		
Shuanmaling Ancient Road, Linje	Linji Town, Qionglai City				
Tiantai Mountain eart stream, Zijing Village ancient road	Tiantaishan Town, Qionglai City	30°13′24″N 103°9′1″E			
Jiaguan Gongdian Ancient Road	Jiaguan Town, Qionglai City	30°15′19″N 103°13′34″E			
Site of ancient fire (salt) well of oil press	Huojing Town, Qionglai City	30°22′54″N 103°13′28″E			
Lining waist rock tea horse ancient road	Chaoyanghu Town, Pujiang County	30°9′17.9″N 103°24′14.4″E	The old stone pathway from the old pine tree on the top of the lined waist rock to the ancient pathway on the shore of Changtan Lake is 470 metres long.		
Songmau Ancient Road (Lung Chi Section)	Longchi Town, Dujiangyan City	31°3′46″N 103°32′4″E			
In Zigong
Lok Shan Square	Ziliujing District				
Huicaikou ancient salt Road	Ziliujing District				
Mugye Beach Pier	Gongjin district	29°21′17″N 104°40′53″E	It consists of two piers, the upper and the lower, and the boat trough was dug in the 35th year of the Kangxi era (1696) and the Pingkang Weir Gate was built in the 30th year of the Guangxu era (1904).		
Gong Jing Old Street salt Road	Gongjin district				
Salt Wharf in Xian Town	Yantan district				
In Luzhou
Guangming Ancient Road	Fuji Town, Lu county	29°07′23″N 105°24′29″E	Located in Guangming Village, Fuzi Town, Lu County, it runs southeast–northwest, with an existing length of 1091m and a width of 1.7m~2.9m.		
Pauline Street Post Road	Longmatan district		It is 810 meters in length.		
Shawan Post Road	Jiangyang district				
Fengming Post Road	Hejiang County	28°42′48″N 105°52′50″E			
Bailu Post Road	Hejiang County				
Xiantan ancient post Road	Hejiang County				
Dashichuanqian post road	Xuyong county				
Monkey Ridge Chuanqian post road	Xuyong county				
Guandou Village Chuanqian post road	Xuyong county				
Chishui River tea horse post Road	Xuyong county				
Erlang Post Road	Gulin county				
In Ya'an
Guanyin Tower	Yucheng district	29°59′26.4″N 102°59′25.5″E			
Jingju nunnery stone archway	Mingshan district	30°4′33.5″N 103°3′13.9″E			
Yu Palace	Mingshan district	30°4′40.6″N 103°2′52.7″E			
Ganlu Ling Quan courtyard stone archway	Mingshan district	30°4′55.7″N 103°2′46.5″E			
Imperial Tea Garden	Mingshan district	30°4′59.8″N 103°2′45.8″E			
Tianti ancient path	Mingshan district	30°4′43.3″N 103°2′51.7″E			
Ganxipo Tea horse ancient Road post site	Tianquan county	30°05′25.6″N 102°41′44.3″E			
Bian tea official warehouse	Tianquan county	30°01′14.8″N 102°49′47.9″E			
Feixian Pass and South Boundary Archway	Lushan county	30°01′35.4″N 102°53′46.1″E			
Saddle waist cliff inscription	Lushan county				
Rebuild the road monument of Daxiangling Bridge	Xingjing County				
The site of Gongxing Tea from the Qing dynasty	Xingjing County	29°47′39.4″N 102°50′28.8″E	Also known as the ginger family compound		
Qingxi Pass Site of Tang dynasty	Hanyuan county				
Ruins of Qingxi ancient city in the Qing dynasty	Qingxi town, Hanyuan County				
Ruins of the 24 Daoguai Ancient Road	Hanyuan county				
Yangquanmen Ancient Road site	Qingxi town, Hanyuan County	29°36′5″N 102°37′48″E			
In Aba
Baizhangfang ancient plank road	Ganbao Township, Li County		It is found on the north bank of the Zaguzhi River near the Baodian Temple in Zaguzhi Township, Gambao Township, Li County		
Stone carvings of Sui and Tang Dynasties in Putou Mountain	Putou Township, Li County				
Kegu Plank Road	Kegu Township, Wenchuan County	31°30′9.1″N 103°34′17.1″E	Located on the north bank of the Miscellaneous Valley Brain River in Keku Township, Wenchuan County, the surviving site is 158 metres long and 0.4–2 metres wide, including two Qing dynasty inscriptions.	克枯栈道	
Poyong ancient Road	Maerkang City				
In Ganzi
Hualinping Tea Horse Ancient Road	Xinglong Town, Luding County	29°42′55.9″N 102°18′14.6″E			
Fo'er Cliff tea Horse ancient Road	Lengqian Town, Luding county	29°46′28.2″N 102°13′40.1″E			
Yingge Mouth Tea Horse Ancient Road	Batang County	29°59′11″N 99°7′30″E			
In Liangshan
Ganluo Qingxi Gorge ancient road	Pingba Township, Ganluo County	29°08′07.0″N 102°34′37.5″E			
Dingshan Bridge and Lingguan Inscriptions in Yuexi	Dingshan Township, Yuexi County	28°35′49.0″N 102°29′48.8″E			
Dengxiangying Ancient Post	Xide County	28°27′59.0″N 102°20′38.1″E			
Xide Mianshan Camp site	Xiande County Mianshan Town	28°22′31.8″N 102°19′40.5″E			
Yalong River in Mianning, including	Mianning County	28°22′02.4″N 101°52′23.9″E; 28°28′13.2″N 101°50′38.4″E			
Songpingguan	Huili County				

=== In Yunnan ===
There are 86 cultural heritage sites on the ancient tea horse route in Yunnan province, located in 21 counties and cities.

Name	Location	Positioning	Description	Picture
In Xiangyun County
Yunnanyi Ancient Road	Yunnanyi Town, Xiangyun County	25°25′29″N 100°41′26″E		
Xiaoshao to Huangcaoshao Ancient Road	Midian Town, Xiangyun County			
Baisha Slope to Yongan Bridge ancient road	Midian Town, Xiangyun County			
Tiger Pass to Puchang River section of the ancient post road	Midian Town, Xiangyun County			
Xincun to Binchuan south boundary monument section of ancient post road	Xiangyun Town, Xiangyun County			
Zhenyang Gate	Gulou East Street, Xiangcheng Town, Xiangyun County	25°28′45″N 100°33′34″E		
Yangbi section
Dahe River street section	Dahejiang Village, Pingpo Village Committee, Pingpo town, Yangbi		Total length 240 meters	
Liziyuan to the dam field section	Liziyuan Village, Pingpo Village Committee, Pingpo town, Yangbi		The total length is about 550 meters, including the original site of Voucher Bridge	
Jinniu Village mud pass section	Jiexin Village of Jinniu Village Committee, Cangshan West Town, Yangbi		Total length 100 meters	
County Bonan section	Jie Village in Cangshan Xicheng town, Yangbi County		Total length 900 meters	
Shuangmo Lane, Xiajie Village	Xiajie Village, Cangshan West Town, Yangbi County		Total length 400 meters	
Yongping section
Jiaogou Mount section	Yongping County			
Wanma Guichao Section	Bonan Town, Yongping County		Total length 140 meters	
Iron Works to Little Flower Bridge	Yongping County		Total length 1600 meters	
Dahuajiao Section	Yongping County			
Bonan Mount Section	Yongping County			
Shanyang Old Street Section	Yongping County			
Midu Section	Yonghe Village, Mizhi Town, Midu County	25°10′03″N 100°31′21″E		
Heqing Xiangmian Mountain section	Heqing County Songgui town, Jindun Township			
Jianchuan section	Shaxi Town, Jianchuan County	26°19′12″N 99°51′03″E		
Simao Section
Site of Caiyang River section	Yutang Village Committee, Yixiang Town, Simao District, Pu 'er City (Caiyang River Nature Reserve)			
Site of Jiejipo section	Simao District, Pu 'er City			
Ning'er County
Site of Cha'an Tang Cha Ma Ancient Road	In Ning'er County, it starts at Minzhu Village, Ning'er Town and ends at Old Fat Tian Group, Xingguang Village, Mohei Town	23°09′37″N 101°08′11″E	27 kilometres in length, 7 kilometres better preserved	
The ancient site of the Korie Tea Horse Road	Ning'er County, starts from Nakoli Village, Tongxin Township, and ends at the foot of Sanjia village, Nanping Town, Simao District	22°54′48″N 101°02′18″E	4.38 km in length	
Site of Peacock Screen Tea Horse Ancient Road	Ning'er County, starting from the Peacock Screen group in Starlight Village, Mohei Town, and ending in Bian village, Mohei Town	23°12′21.4″N 101°09′55.6″E	Approximately 27 km in length, 12 km better preserved	
Yulong County
Seventy-two lines	Yulong County Taian Township, Longpan Township			
Shangri-la City
Twenty-four turn sections	Tiger Leaping Gorge, Shangri-La, starts at Yunuo Village of Yongsheng Village Committee and ends at Yongkuk Village of Sanba Village of Jiangbian Village Committee		38 km in length	
Twelve rail section	Tiger Leaping Gorge Township, Shangri-La City, starting at Huajiao Slope, Hongqi Village Committee and ending at a village, Hongqi Village Committee		8 km in length	
Twelve rail section	Jinma Village, Yanhe Village, Guji Village, Rhinoceros Village, Lushi Town, Fengqing County			
Gongshan Wengli section	East bank of Nujiang River, Wuli Village, Zhongluo Town, Gongshan County		1182m in length	
Lamping Section	Lamping County		Also known as "old me well section"	
Longyang District, Baoshan City
Shui Shi Kan Terraced Cloud Road	Shuizhai Village, Pingpo Village, Shuizhai Township, Longyang District, Baoshan City			
Shuizhaipu ancient street and horse shop	Laojie, Shuizhai Village, Shuizhai Township, Longyang District, Baoshan City			
Guanpo ancient Road flagstone road	Beiniujiao Pass, Guanpo Village, Guanpo Village Committee, Banqiao Town, Longyang District, Baoshan City			
Shek Ma Shan to Wu Tau Tong Ancient Road	3 km west of Qinggangba Village, Hanzhuang Town, Longyang District, Baoshan City			
The Old Stone Path of the Seventy-Six Roads in Lingshui Turnip	Shuijing Pass, Shuijing Village Committee, Pupiao Town, Longyang District, Baoshan City			
The stone path of the ancient road in the Pan Serpent Valley	Pansnake Valley, 1 km west of Dapangqing Village, Ma Street Village Committee, Puxiang Town, Longyang District, Baoshan City			
Huiren Bridge Site	2 km west of Daojie Village, Daojie Village Committee, Luyang District, Baoshan City, on the Nujiang River			
Gaoligong Mountain Beizhai public house Dongpo ancient road	East slope of Gaoligongshan Beizai Gongfang, Mangkuan Township, Longyang District, Baoshan City			
Gaoligong Mountain Nanzhai public house Dongpo ancient road	Gao Li Gong Shan Nan Zhai Public House, Bai Hua Lin Village, Mang Kuan Township, Longyang District, Baoshan City			
Ancient Eastern Slope Trail at Dafengkou, Gaoligong Mountain	Gaoligong Mountain Fengkou Pass, 25 kilometers west of Xiangshu Village, Hemu Village Committee, Lujiang Town, Longyang District, Baoshan City			
Gaoligong Mountain Chengmendong Dongpo ancient road	Longyang District, Baoshan City Lujiang Town Ba Wan Village Committee Pumanshao Village 4 km west of the high east side of the Li Gong Mountain watershed highland			
A bowl of water on the old stone path on the Western slope	Longyang District Banqiao Town, Baoshan City			
Mang-wide double rainbow cable bridge	2 km east of Scalding Xi Village, Mangkuan Township, Longyang District, Baoshan City on the Nu River			
Tengchong section
Beizhai public House west slope ancient road flagstone road	Jietou town,Tengchong City	25°32′39.1″N 98°45′33.4″E		
Chengmen Cave west slope ancient stone road	Mangba Town, Tengchong City	24°56′00.8″N 98°44′41.5″E		
Terracotta paved ancient flagstone road	Mangba Town, Tengchong City	24°59′36.1″N 98°36′40.3″E		
Fengfengkou west slope ancient road SLATE road	Mangba Town, Tengchong City	24°58′07.9″N 98°45′13.7″E		
Big break field slope ancient trough valley road	Zhonghe Town, Tengchong City	25°01′24.1″N 98°14′10.9″E		
Olive Slope ancient road flagstone road	Mangba Town, Tengchong City	24°58′35.3″N 98°39′38.5″E		
Nanzhai public House west slope ancient road flagstone road	Qushi Town, Tengchong City	25°17′26.7″N 98°44′00.2″E		
Huangzhuyuan paved ancient road flagstone road	Mangba Town, Tengchong City	24°58′07.8″N 98°45′13.7″E		
Yubi Slope ancient stone Road	Tengchong Street, Tengchong City	25°00′30.5″N 98°33′28.5″E		
Victory blockhouse	Houqiao Town, Tengchong City	25°20′31.4″N 98°11′12.0″E		
Longchuan County
Shanmu Longshan north slope ancient road	Longchuan County Huiguo Township Shanmulong Village	24°32′15″N 98°05′41″E	5 km in length, 3.2 km extant	
Fir cage Shanxi slope ancient road	Longchuan County Huiguo Township Shanmulong Village			
Lianghe County
Maofu Ancient Road flagstone Road	Maofu Ha Zhai, Maofu Village, Jiubao Township, Lianghe County	24°47′43″N 98°11′56″E		
Deqin County
A Dunzi section	Deqin County			
Meili section	Deqin County			
Lijiang Ancient City District
Qiu Tang Guan Tea horse ancient road section	Gucheng District, Lijiang City			
Shuhe Tea horse ancient road section	Gucheng District, Lijiang City			
Horseshoe print stone path	Gucheng District, Lijiang City			
Yuan County, Puer Town
The Ruins of Guang'en Bridge	Minjiang Village, Enle Town, Zhenyuan County			
Stone carving of the Passing Gate at Xiaoshuijing Liangzi	Yuan County			
The ancient tea and horse route in the Wailing Mountains	Yuan County			

=== In Guizhou ===
Name	Location	location	Description	picture
Guiyang Section
Changpolin Old Road	Baiyun district		Located in the Changpo Ling Forest Park, the masonry is about 3 km long and was built in the Ming dynasty.	
Centipede Slope ancient Road, including Centipede Bridge	Saparing town, Xiuwen County		The post road is now about 5 km long; the Centipede Bridge is a three-hole arch bridge, 41m long and 5m wide, spanning the Cat Cave River.	
Old Black Mud Post Road	Qingzhen City black mud sentinel village		Built during the Hongwu period of the Ming dynasty, it is now 5 km long and built of green stone.	
Black Mud Wharf	Qingzhen City black mud sentinel village		Built in the 16th year of the Daoguang era of the Qing dynasty (1836).	
Qing Yan Ancient Road	Huaxi District Qingyan Town		Built during the Wanli period of the Ming dynasty, it is now 8 km long.	
Bijie Section
Qixingguan Ancient Post Road	Yangjiawan Township, Qixingguan District		The surviving ancient post road is 2 km long and 1-2m wide.	
Seven Star Pass Cliffs	Yangjiawan Township, Qixingguan District			
Bijie Shaanxi Association House	Chengguan Town, Qixingguan District		Also known as the "Spring and Autumn Ancestral Hall", it is located at No. 41, South China Road, Chengguan Town. It was first built during the Qianlong period, sitting west to east, and consists of a street shop, a theatre building, a large hall, a bell tower, a drum tower and a north and south wing.	
Sibao Old Road	Weining County Yan chang town		Located in the southern part of the village of Sibao in the town of Yancang, it was built in the Ming dynasty during the Hongwu period and survives for about 10 km.	
Ying Hong Ancient Road	Jinduo Township, Weining County		Located in Ying Hong Village, Jindou Township, the masonry is about 3 km long, with the existing section from Guanyin Yan to the old town street along the Kedu River.	
Six Hole Bridge Long Beach	Caohai Town, Weining County		It was built in the Qing dynasty during the Xianfeng period and repaired during the Tongzhi period. North-west-south-east, 345m long, of which 328m is the length of the embankment and 3m wide. The dike and the bridge are united, the bridge spans the Dazhong River and is a three-hole stone arch bridge, 17m long and 4.5m wide, with a net span of 3.6m and a height of 2.2m; the dike and the bridge are built of material stone, and willows are planted all over the dike.	
Kedu Bridge	Jinduo Township, Weining County			
Kam Tong Ancient Road	Huangniatang Township, Dafang County		The existing 2 km long, built in the Ming dynasty, is paved with stone.	
Goya Old Road	Shuangshan Township and Zhuyuan Township, Dafang County		Built in the 17th year of the reign of Hongwu (1384), it is now about 5 km long.	
Guli Old Road	Guli Township, Qianxi County		Built in the 17th year of the reign of Hongwu (1384), it is now about 2 km long.	
Parrot's Beak Old Road	Shuitang Township, Hezhang County		Located in the village of Shuitang in the township of Shuitang, it was built in the Ming dynasty during the Hongwu period and is about 3–4 km long.	
Yishenglong Trading Company	Drumfield Street, Jinsha County		Also known as "Rome Street Salt House", it is located at 133 Rome Road, Chengguan Town, and was built in the Qing dynasty. The building is laid out in the "Dragon Gate" style, consisting of a stable, a main room, a north and south wing, a salt storehouse, and a fire-fighting wall.	
Ancient Road of the Yutang River	Jinsha County			
Yidu Rock Carving	Qingchi Township, Jinsha County			
Qing Chi Jiangxi Association House	Qingchi Township, Jinsha County			
Luo Qi's Mei's Festival of Filial Piety	Jinsha County		Built in the fifth year of the Daoguang era (1825), it is approximately 9 metres high.	
Anshun section
Jigongbei Old Post Station	Guanglin County			
Guangsoling Ancient Post Road, including the ruins of the Ba Ling Bridge	Guanglin County			
Goshulou Sekidai	Guanglin County			
Beikou Ancient Post Road	Guanglin County			
Anlong Ancient Post Road	Guanglin County			
Panjiang Bridge Stone Carving Group	Guanling County, Anshun City and Qinglong County, Qianxinan Prefecture			
Liupanshui Section
The ancient road from Daitieguan to Canziyao (Liuzhi section)	Liuzhi District			
Old Soft Bridge Post Road with Welcome Bridge	Panzhou City			
Xiaojiezi Ancient Road	Panzhou City			
Huopu Ancient Road	Panzhou City			
Chating Ancient Road	Panzhou City			
Mothballed Old Road	Panzhou City		Also known as the Golden Land Ancient Road.	
Plumtree Old Road	Panzhou City		Also known as the Great Water Well Ancient Road.	
Pingguan to Shengjingguan Ancient Road	Panzhou City			
Shaoshang Ancient Road	Panzhou City		Also known as the Two Rivers Water Gully Ancient Road.	
Shiguan Old Road	Panzhou City			
Qianxinan section
Panjiang Bridge Stone Carving Group	Qinglong County, Qianxinan Prefecture, Guanling County, Anshun City			
Pan River Bridge Old Road	Qinglong County			
The Ancient Road of Halfpond	Qinglong County			
Angul Pahang	Angu Township, Qinglong County		Built in 1826, it is a brick and porcelain structure with four columns and three single doors.	
Pinehill Temple	Pu'an County			
Daitieguan to Canziyao Ancient Road (Pu'an section)	Pu'an County			
Ma Ling Old Road (with wooden bridge)	Yilong New District			

== Historical value ==
=== The ruins of Guangen Bridge ===
The site of Guangen Bridge is located in Minjiang Village, Zhen Yuan County and Enle Old Street river bank, built in the early Qing dynasty, the bridge is 188 meters long, with stone piers and wooden frames, and more than 50 tiled houses on both sides. Qing Yongzheng five years (1727) flooding washed away, the Qing dynasty Yongzheng eight years (1730) and the Qing dynasty Daoguang three years (1823), the county Tan on the restoration of the wide grace bridge.

Qing dynasty Daoguang six years (1826), the county Zhang Zhao additional repaired the Guangen Bridge. Qing dynasty Tongzhi's first year (1862), this bridge was burned again.

In the middle of the Republic of China, repaired into a stone pier wooden surface bridge. Early liberation of China, the bridge was washed away by the river, now only four stone piers, the rest were covered by the river bank sediment, stone pier part in 1973 to build the Enable Bridge with stone was demolished. Now the west bank pier is 4.2 meters high, 12.6 meters wide, and 9.7 meters long, complete preservation.

=== Bunakuo ===
"Bunakuo" is the translation of the Naxi language, Chinese means "artemisia plain", because of the wild artemisia growing everywhere and the name, as known as "Guangle village". The administrative area belongs to Jinan Town of Gucheng District, which was the largest market town on the eastern route of the ancient tea horse road in ancient times, and is rich in cultural relics, natural landscapes, ethnic culture and other tourism resources. The natural scenery of Leidashan Mountain, the culture of Guzong created by the Tibetan descendants of the Guzong people who migrated from Yanjing in Tibet, and the local Naxi Dongba culture are intertwined here.

== Safeguard procedures ==
On March 5, 2013, the Tea Horse Ancient Road was announced by The State Council of the People's Republic of China as the seventh batch of national key cultural relic protection units.

== Future ==
In the 21st century, the legacy of the Tea-Horse Road has been used to promote a railway that will connect Chengdu to Lhasa. This planned railroad, part of the PRC's 13th 5-Year Plan, is called the Sichuan-Tibet railway (川藏铁路); it will connect cities across the route including Kangding. Authorities claim it will bring great benefit to the people's welfare.

== Gallery ==
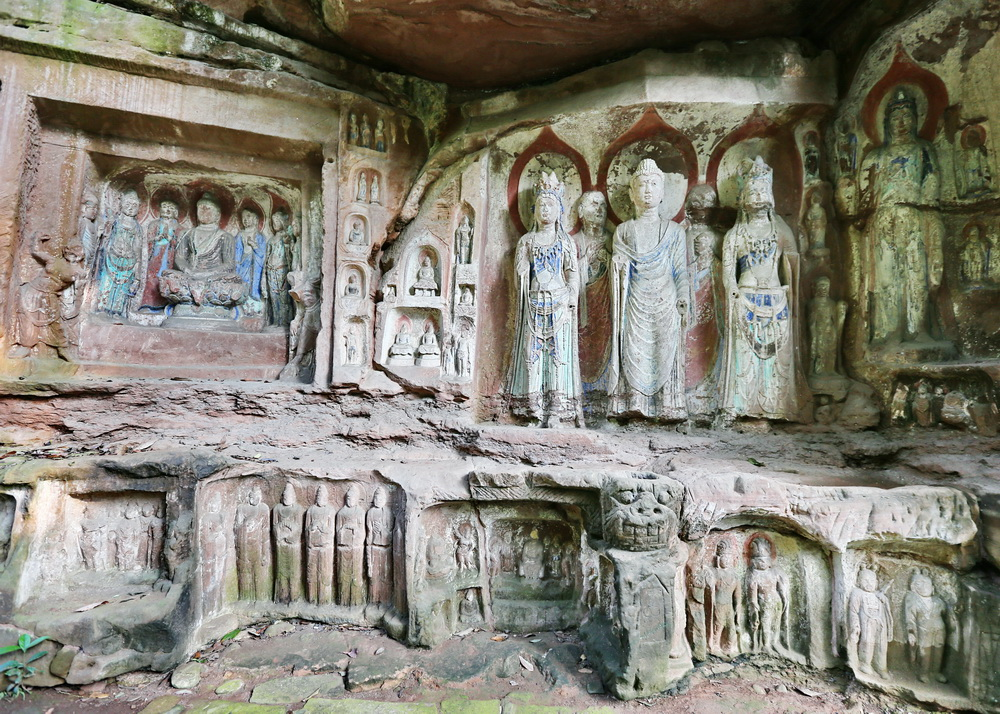
Feixiange Grottoes (689 AD), Buddhist art on the route from Chengdu to Ya'an.

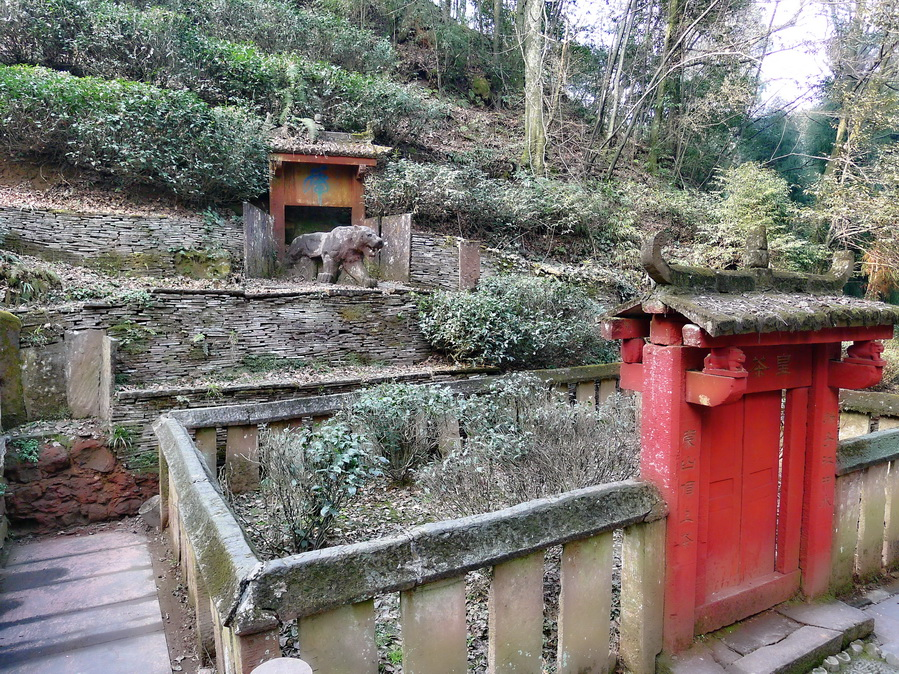
The Royal Tea Garden, named by Emperor Xiaozong of Song (1186 AD) on Mount Mengding. Mount Mengding is the place where tea was first cultivated with written records (65 BC).

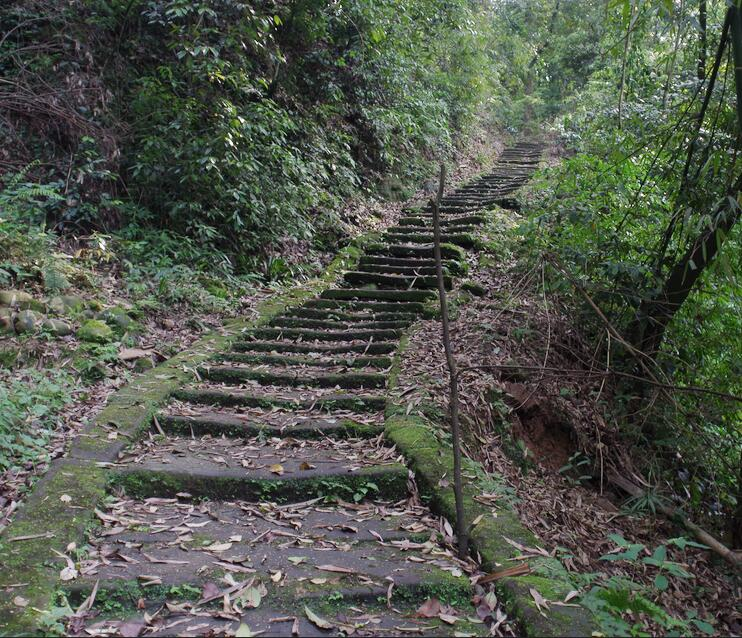
The surviving ancient route in Pujiang between Chengdu and Ya'an.

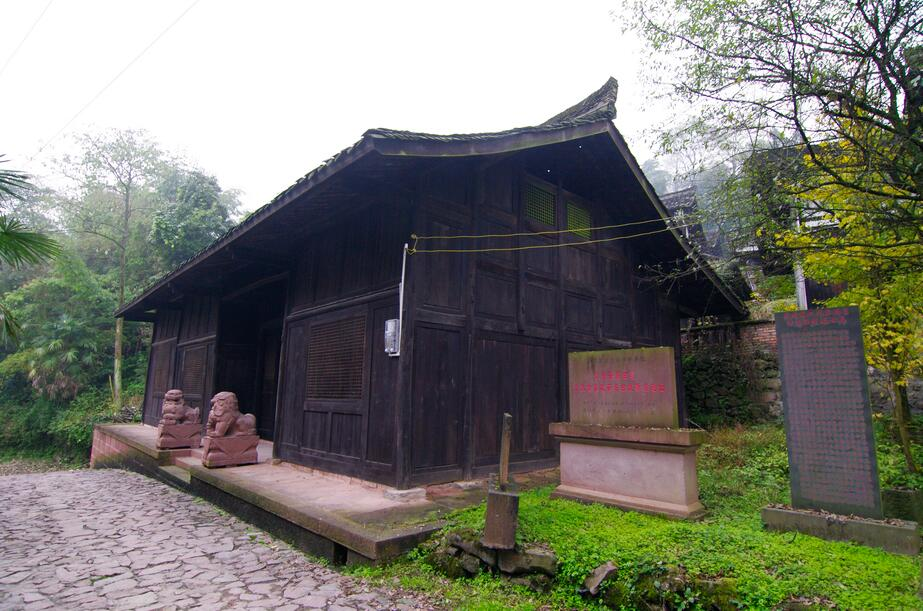
The historical site of Ganxipo Posthouse on the route in Tianquan, Sichuan.

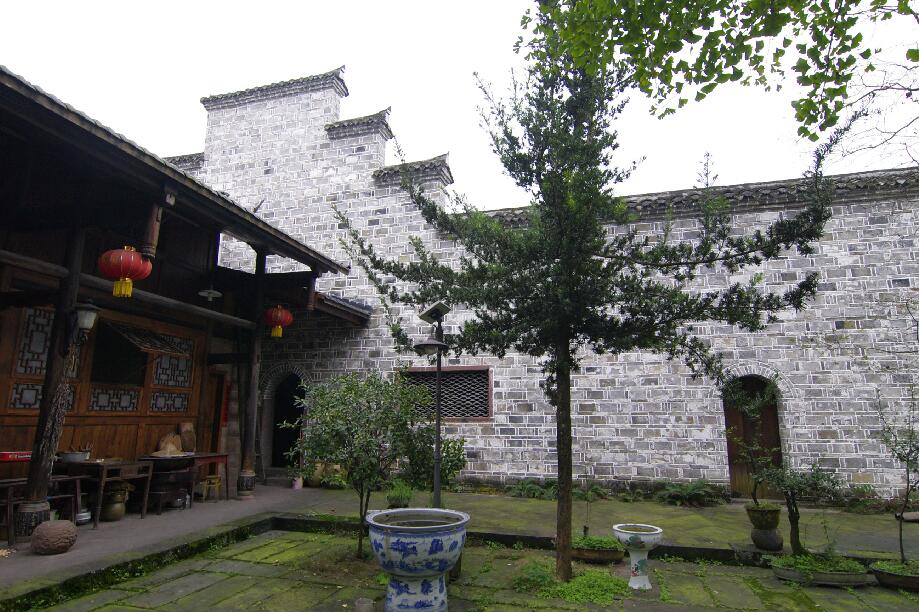
The official tea warehouse of Tea Horse Bureau (Qing dynasty) on the route in Tianquan, Sichuan.

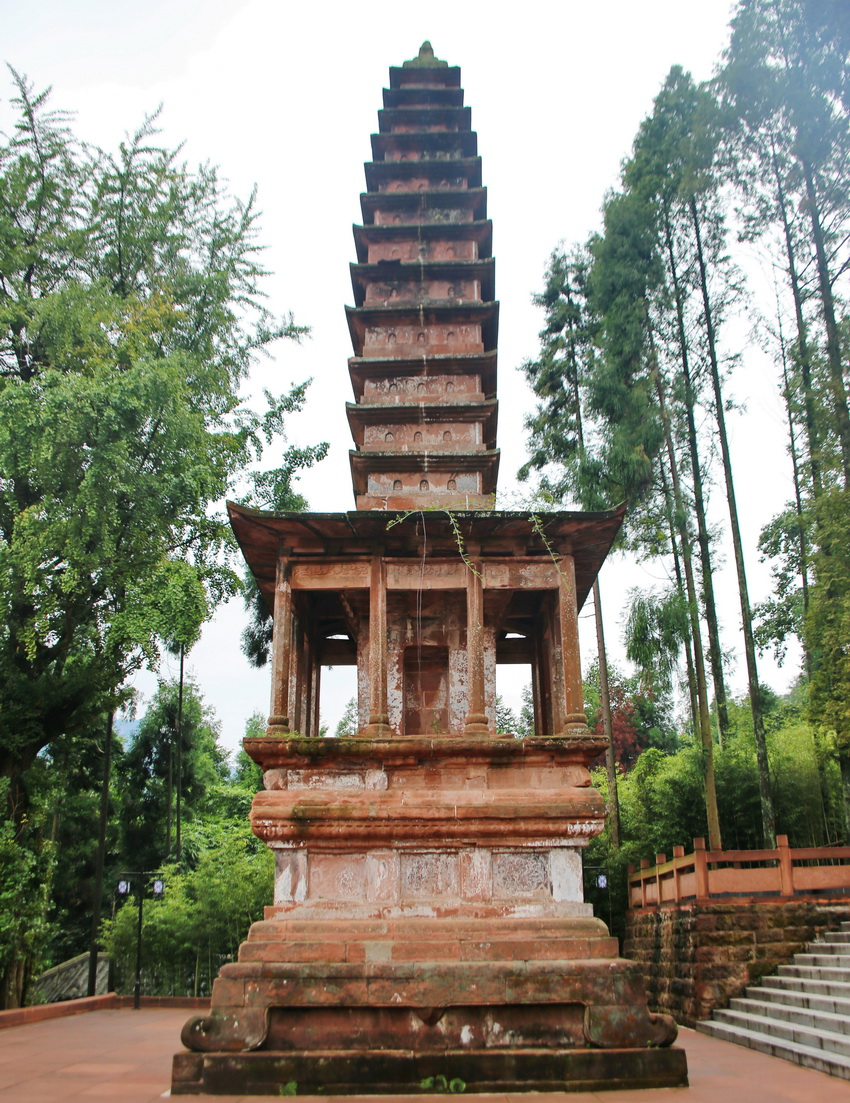
The stone pagoda of Shita Temple (1169 AD) on the route from Chengdu to Ya'an.

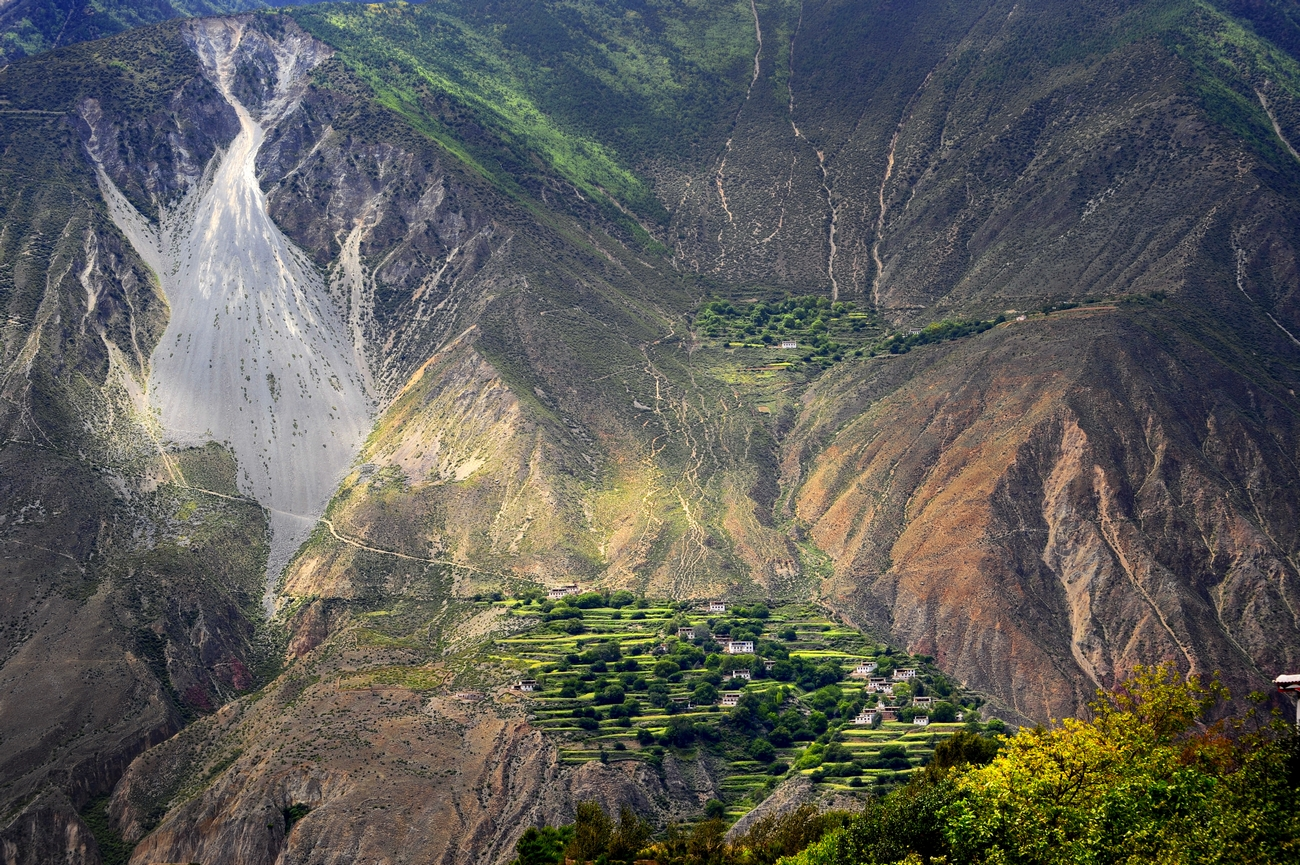
Markham County in the very east of Tibet. In this region, near upper Mekong, there was the junction of the Sichuan and Yunnan branches of the route.

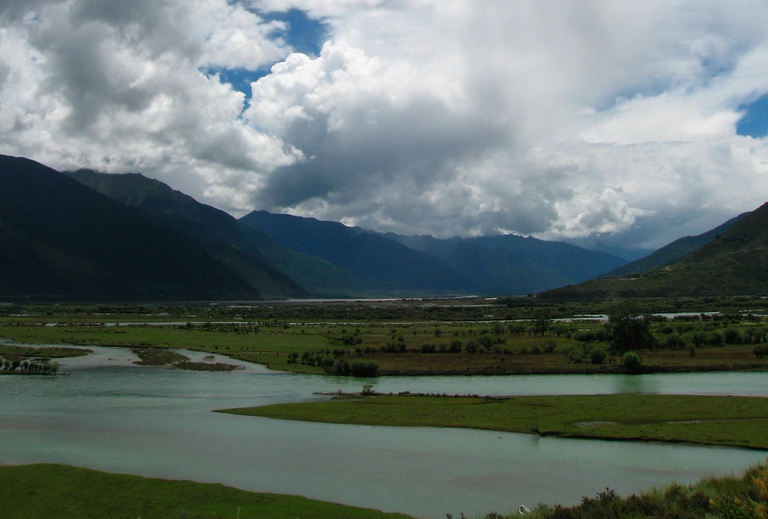
Mekong valley near Chamdo, where the river is crossed by the Tea-Horse-Route

== See also ==
- Tea
- Pu'er tea
- Mengding Ganlu tea
- Tang–Tibet relations
- Song–Tibet relations
- Shaxi, Yunnan, a well-preserved historical trading town in Jianchuan County on the ancient tea route
- Siberian Route
- Silk Road
- Jeff Fuchs, the first westerner to walk the entire road
- The Amazing Race 18, the sixth episode of the series briefly touched on the Tea Horse Road with the Roadblock task
