= Outpost Magazine =

Canadian adventure-travel magazine

- Editor: Deborah Sanborn
- Categories: Adventure travel
- Frequency: Bimonthly
- Publisher: Matt Robinson
- Founder: Christopher Frey and Kisha Ferguson
- First issue: 1996
- Final issue Number: 2022; 130
- Company: Outpost Travel Media
- Country: Canada
- Based in: Toronto, Ontario
- Language: English
- Website: outpostmagazine.com

Outpost Magazine was a Canadian adventure-travel magazine published in Toronto, Ontario, from 1996 to 2022. Founded by journalists Christopher Frey and Kisha Ferguson, it focused on first-person travel narratives, photography, cultural reporting and active or self-propelled travel, often presented from a Canadian perspective.

Initially developed as a print publication, Outpost later expanded into web publishing, video, podcasts, social media and destination-based multimedia projects. Its reporting expeditions, branded as opXpeditions, brought together writers, editors, photographers and videographers to produce coordinated print and digital coverage. In 2002, Outpost was named Magazine of the Year at the National Magazine Awards. Issue 130, released in 2022, was the final print issue listed in the publication's back-issue catalogue.

== History ==
=== Founding and early growth ===
Frey and Ferguson developed the concept for Outpost while teaching English in Japan. A 1997 profile in the Los Angeles Times described the magazine as being concerned less with conventional destination guides than with the experience of travel, including the people, food, music and cultures encountered along the way. Ferguson similarly told The Eyeopener that the publication emphasized culture, people and active, self-propelled travel rather than destination-focused tourism coverage.

The publication began in 1996 as a small, independent venture. Ferguson and Frey financed the production of a full-colour glossy magazine, initially relied on volunteer writers and photographers, and sold advertising themselves before hiring dedicated marketing staff. By 1998, The Eyeopener reported that Outpost had grown into a national adventure-travel magazine with circulation exceeding 20,000.

An official Canadian trademark record identifies the original owner as "Kisha Ferguson and Christopher Frey, a partnership owning Outpost Productions". The record states that the Outpost mark had been used in Canada since 12 March 1996 for a travel magazine and was later registered for travel-related website, television and radio services.

=== Investment, ownership and market development ===
In 1999, Montreal-based BHVR Communications, then the owner of Shift magazine, acquired a minority interest in Outpost. Majority control remained with publisher Christopher Frey, editor-in-chief Kisha Ferguson and advertising director Matt Robinson, who continued to oversee the magazine's day-to-day operations. The investment was intended to support circulation, marketing and infrastructure as the publication prepared to adopt a bimonthly schedule in 2000.

In 2001, after funding from an earlier minority investor ended, Outpost sold another minority interest to Concepts Travel Media, publisher of the travel-industry trade publication Travelweek. Frey, Ferguson and Robinson retained majority control. Concepts Travel Media assumed several infrastructure functions, including circulation, mailing, accounting and business management.

The magazine received national recognition in 2002 when it was named Magazine of the Year at the National Magazine Awards. By 2004, Strategy described Outpost as a niche Canadian adventure-travel title with approximately 35,000 readers. Robinson said the publication relied on partnerships, direct promotions and integrated programs to reach advertisers rather than depending on Print Measurement Bureau readership data. Examples included partnerships with the National Post and Outdoor Life Network, promotions through Chapters, and postcard and poster campaigns.

In 2005, Outpost Inc. was awarded $25,000 through the Ontario Media Development Corporation Magazine Fund, one of several public programs that later supported the company's efforts to develop new publishing and distribution models.

=== Reporting expeditions ===
A recurring feature of the magazine was the use of field-reporting projects that combined travel writing, photography and, increasingly, video. These projects were eventually branded as opXpeditions. Archived project pages and published expedition stories show that teams could include writers, editors, photographers, videographers and creative staff, with each member producing material for different platforms.

Projects covered destinations in Canada and abroad, including Jordan, Taiwan, Colombia, Quebec, Peru and northern Canada. Some expeditions were structured around a historical or documentary question. Evan Solomon led projects investigating the fate of Franklin's lost expedition in Nunavut and searching for remains of the fur trade along Ontario's Missinaibi River.

The magazine also worked with tourism organizations on destination projects. In 2013, the Jordan Tourist Board and Outpost presented a video following an Outpost team through Jordan at a Toronto travel-industry event. The report identified Simon Vaughan as the magazine's senior editor and travel adviser and described the video as presenting the country's cultural and adventure-travel experiences through the team's journey.

==== Selected expedition projects ====
Among the magazine's documented expedition projects were:

- a Nunavut investigation led by Evan Solomon into the fate of Franklin's lost expedition, produced before the discovery of the wrecks of Franklin's ships;
- a Missinaibi River project involving Solomon, Les Stroud, a marine archaeologist, divers, photographers and video crews, which combined historical reporting with an underwater search for fur-trade material;
- a Taiwan project whose archived team page identified distinct editorial, writing, creative and video roles within Team Outpost;
- a Quebec expedition through the Eastern Townships, Quebec City and the Saguenay–Lac-Saint-Jean region, documented through long-form writing, photography, cycling and other outdoor activities; and
- the 2018 In From the Outpost Peru project, which gathered print stories, online reporting, video and photography for distribution across several platforms.

=== Digital expansion and multimedia ===
During the 2010s, Outpost broadened its operations beyond the print magazine. Ontario Creates described Outpost Travel Media as producing original stories for print and online publication, video for destination microsites, and material for social-media and television development. The company's web properties included the main Outpost site, In From the Outpost, Tan Your Mind and the developing Outpost TV initiative.

The cross-platform approach allowed material gathered on one assignment to be repurposed for several formats. In 2018, a seven-person team travelled to Peru for In From the Outpost with Jeff Fuchs. According to Ontario Creates, the team collected stories for print and online publication, hours of video and thousands of photographs for several projects, including material intended for Outpost TV.

Ontario Creates characterized this strategy as a shift from collecting material principally for the magazine toward distributing and monetizing original stories across multiple platforms. The profile also described a growing social-media presence intended to connect audiences with the publication's editorial work and advertisers.

The publication's multimedia work also included podcasts and web-first series. In 2018, journalist Michael Fraiman hosted the travel-work podcast series How to Make Money Travelling, which examined occupations that could be pursued while travelling. Recurring online projects included Jeff Fuchs's Tea Sessions, which combined travel writing, photography and reporting on tea cultures and historic trade routes.

=== End of print publication ===
Outpost continued to publish six print issues a year during its later multimedia expansion. Issue 130, released in early 2022, is the last print edition listed in the magazine's official back-issue catalogue. The website continued to host the publication's archive and publish travel material during 2022, but no subsequent print issue is listed. The publisher's online shop retained a catalogue of later print issues and back issues, preserving a partial record of the magazine's final years.

== Editorial approach and contributors ==
From its earliest years, Outpost positioned itself around experiential travel rather than conventional destination summaries. Its features frequently combined first-person narrative, cultural observation, practical travel information and documentary photography. The magazine's later expedition model extended this approach by assembling teams whose work could appear in print, on the web, in social media and in video productions.

The publication's editorial leadership included co-founder and founding editor-in-chief Kisha Ferguson, publisher Matt Robinson and later editor-in-chief Deborah Sanborn. Ferguson served as editor-in-chief for more than eight years after co-founding the magazine. Print mastheads from the mid-2010s included specialized positions for online editing, gear coverage, art and creative direction, travel-health coverage and regional editors-at-large, reflecting the combination of print, service journalism and multimedia production.

Selected recurring editors and contributors included:

- Evan Solomon and Les Stroud, who were described by the magazine as contributing editors and collaborated on the Missinaibi River expedition.
- Jeff Fuchs, a longtime editor-at-large whose work focused on mountain cultures, historic trade routes and tea cultures.
- Ryan Murdock, an editor-at-large who wrote long-form features on travel, history and world cultures.
- Daniel Puiatti, credited on print mastheads as Associate/Online Editor and also published as a travel writer.

== Awards ==
Outpost was named Magazine of the Year at the 2002 National Magazine Awards.
