= Tibetan conquest of the Tarim Basin =

Tibetan-Tang Conflict 670CE

- Part of Tang–Tibet relations
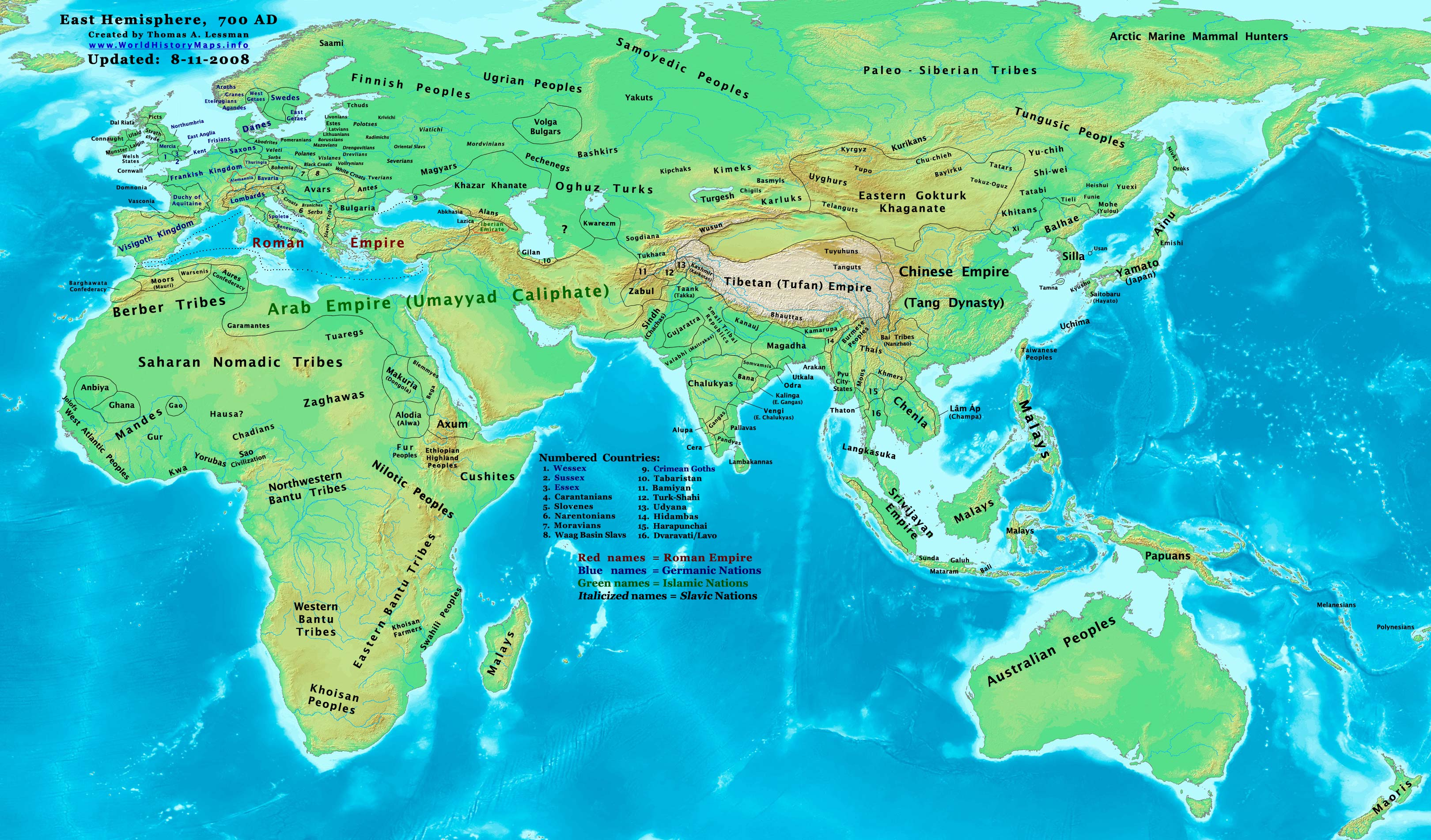
- The Tibetan Empire in 700 AD
Date	670–678
Location	Tarim Basin, Tang China (modern-day China)
Result	Tibetan victory
Territorial changes	Tibet gains control over the Tarim Basin

Belligerents
Tibetan Empire; Western Turkic Khaganate; Khotan Kingdom	Tang dynasty

Commanders and leaders
Mangsong Mangtsen; Gar Trinring Tsendro; Ashina Tuizi	Xue Rengui; Kuo Tai-feng

Strength
200,000	100,000

The Tibetan conquest of the Tarim Basin was a series of military campaigns by the Tibetan Empire against the Tang dynasty from 670 to 678, which resulted in Tibetan control over large portions of the Tarim Basin and surrounding regions. This marked the first period of Tibetan dominance over the region, significantly reducing Tang China's influence in Central Asia.

== Background ==
In the mid-7th century, the Tibetan Empire expanded greatly under the rule of Mangsong Mangtsen as it sought to gain control of Central Asia. The Tuyuhun Kingdom, which had functioned as a buffer state between Tibet and China, was already under Tibetan control by 663. In the late 660s, the Tibetans once again focused their energies on the Tarim Basin, a key region to control trade routes on the Silk Road. The weakened and divided Western Turks, further falling under Tibetan domination, increasingly facilitated their thrust against the Chinese-held oasis states.

== Tibetan Invasion and Early Gains ==
In 667, two Western Turkic leaders, Ashina Tuizi and Li Che-fu, led their tribes in submission to Tibet. This alliance strengthened Tibetan influence in Central Asia. In 668, Tibet constructed defensive fortifications along the Jima Gol (Ta-fei Ch'uan) in anticipation of a Chinese counterattack. By 670, the Tibetans launched a large-scale offensive against the remaining Chinese-controlled territories in the western Tarim Basin, aided by forces from Khotan, which had fallen under their control between 665 and 670. Tibetan forces rapidly captured Aksu, leaving only Kucha and Agni (Karashahr) under Tang control. Instead of launching an immediate counterattack, the Tang military withdrew from their westernmost strongholds, effectively ceding control of the Tarim Basin to the Tibetans.

=== Tang Counteroffensive and Defeat ===
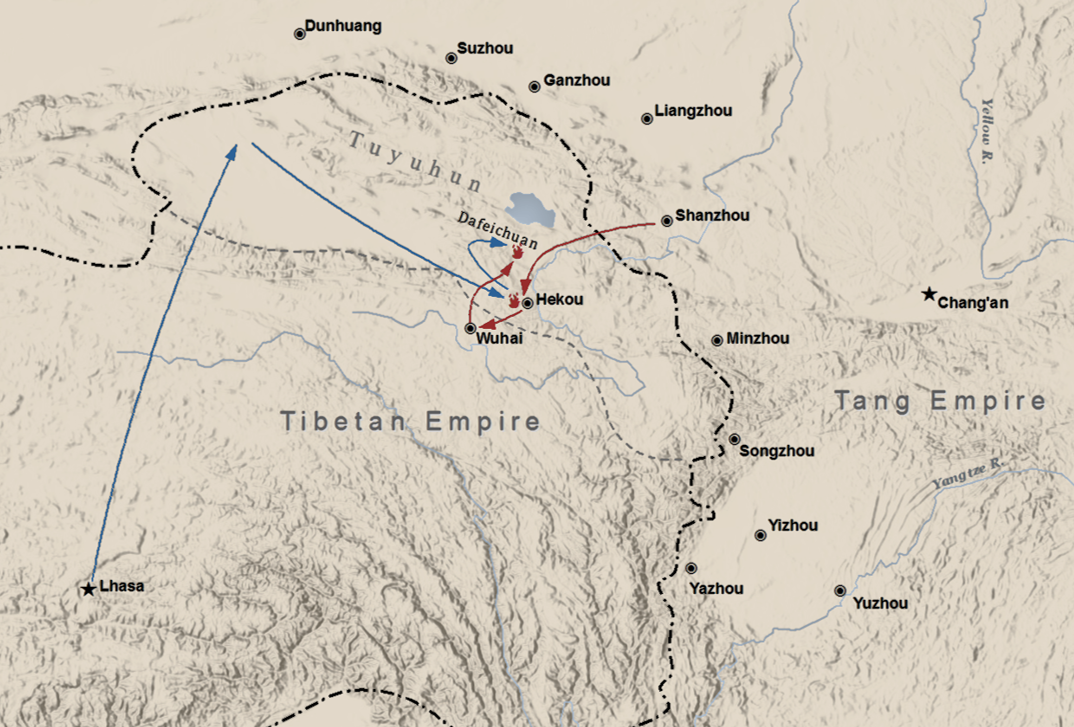
Map of the Battle of Dafei River

Recognizing the strategic importance of the region, the Tang court mobilized a massive expeditionary force. On May 3, 670, Emperor Gaozong appointed Xue Rengui as commander of the newly assembled Tang army. Initially, Xue Rengui achieved success, routing a Tibetan contingent near the Ta-fei Ch'uan and seizing large numbers of livestock. However, his deputy, Kuo Tai-feng, failed to fortify the supply lines, leading to a disastrous Tibetan counterattack. Tibetan forces under Mgar Khri-brin ambushed the Chinese army, almost annihilating the Tang forces and forcing the Tang army into retreat.

=== Second Tang expedition ===
In 678, another Tang army fighting in the Qinghai area also suffered a devastating defeat, a disaster brought about by the Tibetan troops. Then, just two years later, in 680, the Tibetan army managed to seize the strategically situated fortress of Anrong in the mountainous border terrain of northwestern Sichuan.

== Aftermath ==
The defeat at the Dafei River and the Tibetan successes that followed marked the end of twenty years of Chinese control over the Tarim Basin. The Tang court relocated the Anxi Protectorate capital from Kucha to the safer city of Turfan. Tibet de facto ruled the area for the rest of the next twenty years. This period marked a high point of Tibetan expansion, as they continued consolidating their hold over Central Asia.
