= Song–Tibet relations =

Study of historical China-Tibet relations

The history of the relationship between the Song dynasty (960–1279) of China and Tibetan regimes during the Era of Fragmentation is a diplomatic history between imperial China and Tibet. Unlike the preceding Tang–Tibet relations in which both parties were military powers, the Song–Tibet relations were ones of relative peace and cultural creativity.

== History ==
The Song dynasty was established in 960 A.D. Although the military power of this new empire was not as strong as the previous Tang dynasty had been, and it rarely contacted the Tibetan tribes of Ü-Tsang who dwelled far from the Han, it did keep in touch with Tibetan tribes living in Gansu, Qinghai and Yunnan province where Han Chinese people were also domiciled.

Not long after the establishment of the Song dynasty, a Tibetan tribe leader named Gusiluo (Chio-ssi-lo) set up a regime in the Huangshui basin centered on Miaochuan (now Ledu) and Qingtang (now Xining) and defended it from an attack by the kingdom of Western Xia launched by its leader, Li Yuan-hao. The Gusiluo regime was the biggest and the first feudal Anduo regime led by Tibetan people at that time. The Gusiluo regime maintained a harmonious relationship with Song, sending envoys to pay tribute and ask for honorable official titles from Song. In 1032 A.D (the first year of Mingdao, the reign title of Emperor Renzong of Song), Emperor Renzong titled Gusiluo "Ningyuan General" and "defending militia leader in Aizhou", along with a generous salary. In 1041 A.D (the second year of Kangding), the emperor of Song formed an alliance with Gusiluo to combat the kingdom of Western Xia, and awarded Gusiluo another two official posts, "inspecting and supervising officer in Chongbaoshun" and "supply commissioner for Hexi army". Thereafter the descendants of Guosiluo: Dong zhan, E guo-gu, Xia zheng, Long za, Xi she-luo-sa, all accepted the honorable official title given by Song.

However, the relationship between the Chio-ssi-lo tribe and the Northern Song dynasty was not peaceful. After Wang An-shi became the Song prime minister, he changed the policy of allying with Chio-ssi-lo to combat the kingdom of Western Xia into conquering Chio-ssi-lo as a springboard for attacking Western Xia. In 1072 A.D, a military officer of Song, Wang Shao, led an army to attack Gusiluo, occupying the Xihe region that was once under the control of Gusiluo. This forced Gusiluo to cooperate with Western Xia to attack Hezhou in Song. The frontier general of Hezhou was killed in this attack. In 1077 A.D, Song was forced to ally with Gusiluo again, elevating ing its king, Dongzhan, to ‘Highness of Wuwei’. In 1096 A.D, Song availed itself of the opportunity brought by inner melee that followed the takeover by a new king, Xiazheng, of the throne in 1099 A.D, and sent two generals, Wang han and Wang zhan, to assail Gusiluo, which forced Xia Zheng and his successor Long za to surrender to Song sequentially. However, Song failed to control that region and had to withdraw its army the following year, bestowing on the successor Xi she-luo-sa the title of ‘supply commissioner of Xiping army’ and the ‘head of Miaochuan’.

In 1103 A.D., Song again defeated Xi she-luo-sa and established a puppet government there, annexing the entire territory of Gusiluo into Song in 1116 A.D. In 1134 A.D, the original territory of Gusiluo was occupied by another military power, the Jin, and the last leader, Zhao Huai-en, of Gusiluo fled to the Southern Song dynasty (1127 A.D-1279 A.D).

In addition, Emperor Zhenzong of Song bestowed on another Tibetan leader, Pan Luozhi of Liu Gu tribe in Wuwei region, the title of ‘defending minister of Jianzhou and inspecting and supervising minister for the west part of Lingzhou’ in 1001 A.D (the fourth year of Xianping, the reign title of emperor Zhenzong)

The Song dynasty had long been carrying out the policy of "farming in the frontier region to supply the army" in the south part of Gansu Province, Hexi corridor, eastern Qinghai Province and northwest Sichuan Province that had been controlled by Tibet since the 11th century defense against the attack from Western Xia, as well as improving its self-protecting power. Song had also exported weapons like bows and arrows to Tibetan tribes living in the Hexi corridor and recruited Tibetan archers into the militia system for mutual defense against the assaults of Western Xia. The General Wang Shao, greatly exploited the land of Linxia and Lintao in Gansu province, recruiting up to 300 thousand Tibetans to do the ploughing. The renowned "Tea and Horse market" through the Tea Horse Road was also promoted in some special markets opened by Song in regions of Yaan in Sichuan province, Linxia in Gansu province and Shanxi province, inaugurating the fixed trade of horse and tea that lasted for hundreds of years.

Both Song China and Tibetan regimes were conquered by the Mongol Empire in the 13th century. Their territories were incorporated into the Yuan dynasty founded by Kublai Khan.

== See also ==
- Tang–Tibet relations
- Tibet under Yuan rule
- Ming–Tibet relations
- Tibet under Qing rule
- History of Tibet
- Tea Horse Road
