= Timeline of the Era of Fragmentation =

History of Tibet, 842 to 1253

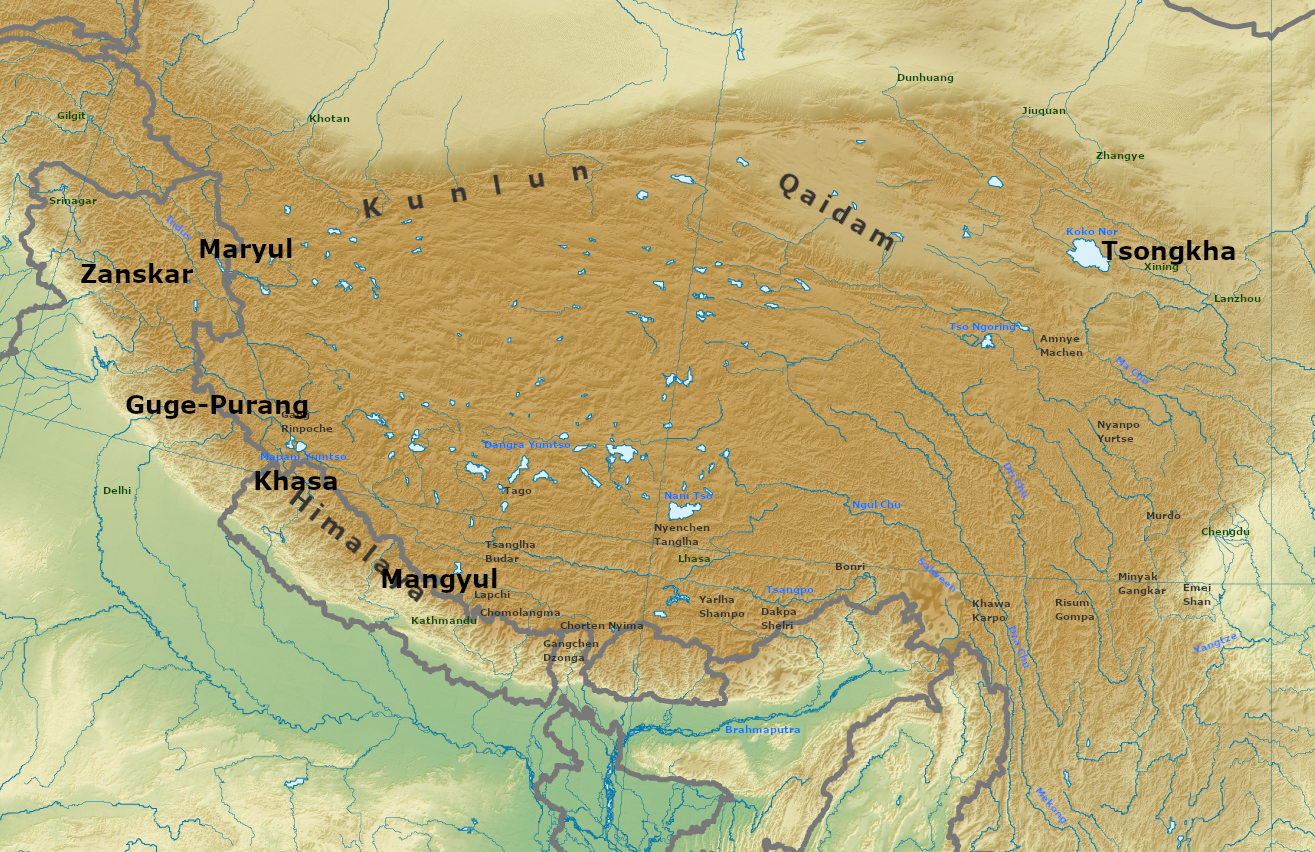
Tibet during the Era of Fragmentation

This is a timeline of the Era of Fragmentation, the period of Tibetan history lasting from the death of the Tibetan Empire's last emperor, Langdarma, in 842 until Drogön Chögyal Phagpa gained control over the three provinces of Tibet in 1253 under Mongol rule.

== 9th century ==
Year	Date	Event
842		Langdarma dies and the Tibetan Empire enters its Era of Fragmentation; Tibet is split between Langdarma's sons Ösung in the west, and Yumtän in the east
843		Karasahr and Kucha are occupied by the Kingdom of Qocho
847		Tibetan troops raid the Hexi Corridor but are defeated by Tang troops at Yanzhou
848		Zhang Yichao, a resident of Dunhuang, rebels and captures Shazhou and Guazhou from the Tibetans
849		Tibetan commanders and soldiers in seven garrisons west of Yuanzhou defect to the Tang
850		Zhang Yichao takes Hami, Ganzhou and Suzhou
851		Zhang Yichao captures Gaochang and Khotan becomes independent
866		Tibetans retreat to the Tibetan Plateau

== 10th century ==
Year	Date	Event
904		A popular revolt breaks out in Tibet
910		Popular revolt breaks Tibet into numerous principalities: Tsangto Yul, Rutsham Zhunye, Panyul, Yarlung, Tamshul Lhodrak, Cho, and Chokhor
925		The kingdom of Ngari Korsum is founded by Ösung's grandson, Kyide Nyimagon, in the capital of Purang
930		Ngari Khorsum splits into three kingdoms under Kyide Nyimagon's sons: Purang-Guge Kingdom controlled by Tashigon, Maryul controlled by Lhachen Dpalgyimgon, Zanskar and Spiti controlled by Detsugon
970		Songne becomes king of Purang-Guge Kingdom
975		Songne sends Rinchen Zangpo to study Buddhism in Kashmir
988		Songne abdicates to become a monk and changes his name to Yeshe-Ö; his brother Khore becomes king
996		Yeshe-Ö founds the Tholing Monastery
997		The elders of Amdo find a descendant of the Yarlung dynasty in Gaochang by the name of Qinanling Wenqianbu. They take him to Hezhou, where he is named Gusiluo, otherwise known as Gyelsé, meaning "son of Buddha".
998		Tabo Monastery is built by Rinchen-zangpo in Spiti

== 11th century ==
Year	Date	Event
1008		Gusiluo is enthroned at Kuozhou as Tsenpo.
1017		Tsongkha is defeated by the Song dynasty commander Cao Wei.
1020		Due to a large number of refugees from Punjab, Himachal Pradesh, and regions around Delhi fleeing Mahmud of Ghazni, the Ngari king passed a law restricting foreigners from staying in the country for more than three years
1024		King Ode of Purang-Guge expands his realm
1025		Gusiluo relocates to Miaochuan.
1032		Gusiluo relocates to Qingtang. Around the same time his eldest son Xiazhan establishes himself in Hezhou and his second son Mozhanjiao in Tsongkha.
1037		King Ode dies in battle against the Kara-Khanid Khanate near Skardu
1042		Atiśa, a Bengali Buddhist master, visits Ngari and stays at Mangnang Monastery for a year
1054		Tsongkha assists the Song army in resolving a dispute among Tibetan tribes.
1058		A Khitan princess marries Gusiluo's son Dongzhan. Dongzhan kills his brothers, Xiazhan and Mozhanjiao.
1065		Gusiluo dies and is succeeded by his son Dongzhan. Mucheng, son of Xiazhan, declares independence in Hezhou.
1070		The monks Jiewuchila and Kangzunxinluojie attempt to enthrone Mucheng's younger brother Donggu at Wushengjun but fail.
1072		The Song dynasty gains control of Wushengjun.
1072		Purang-Guge Kingdom splits into independent Guge and Purang, ruled by the brothers Tsede and Tsensong respectively; another brother Tsende may have founded the Khasa Kingdom
1074		Dongzhan and Mucheng submit to Song governance.
1076		King Tsede of Guge organizes the Toling Chokhor (religion conference for Tibetan and Indian Buddhists)
1099		Tsongkha is briefly occupied by the Song dynasty before regaining independence.

== 12th century ==
Year	Date	Event
1102		The Song dynasty occupy Tsongkha and rename Qingtang to Xining.
1109		The Song dynasty registers all the Tibetan towns of Kokonor under Chinese names.
1110		King Sonamtse's sons split Guge into three kingdoms
1120		Guge regent Jowo Gyalpo founds the kingdom of Khunu
1136		The Jin dynasty (1115–1234) incorporates the area of Tsongkha and cedes some territory to the Western Xia.
1150		The Khasa Kingdom emerges as the strongest power in Ngari
1159		The first Nyingma monastery since Langdarma is built

== 13th century ==
Year	Date	Event
1201		Sakya Pandita travels to India and studies under Indian gurus. He becomes a great religious and cultural figure and creates a Tibetan literary tradition inspired by Sanskrit poetry.
1220		The Khasa Kingdom expands into the territory of Garhwal and Kumaon
1230		Khabpa (Prince of Khab) establishes himself as ruler of Mangyül Gungthang
1239		The Khasa Kingdom defeats Mangyül Gungthang
1240		Mongol invasions of Tibet: Doorda Darkhan sacks Reting Monastery; a proxy administration is set up at Drigung Monastery
1252		Mongol invasions of Tibet: Qoridai invades Tibet as far as Dangquka
1253		Kublai Khan meets Drogön Chögyal Phagpa and promotes the Sakya school of Tibetan Buddhism

== Bibliography ==
- Andrade, Tonio (2016), The Gunpowder Age: China, Military Innovation, and the Rise of the West in World History, Princeton University Press, ISBN 978-0-691-13597-7.
- Asimov, M.S. (1998), History of civilizations of Central Asia Volume IV The age of achievement: A.D. 750 to the end of the fifteenth century Part One The historical, social and economic setting, UNESCO Publishing
- Atwood, Christopher P. (2004), Encyclopedia of Mongolia and the Mongol Empire, Facts On File
- Barfield, Thomas (1989), The Perilous Frontier: Nomadic Empires and China, Basil Blackwell
- Barrett, Timothy Hugh (2008), The Woman Who Discovered Printing, Great Britain: Yale University Press, ISBN 978-0-300-12728-7 (alk. paper)
- Beckwith, Christopher I (1987), The Tibetan Empire in Central Asia: A History of the Struggle for Great Power among Tibetans, Turks, Arabs, and Chinese during the Early Middle Ages, Princeton University Press
- Bregel, Yuri (2003), An Historical Atlas of Central Asia, Brill
- Drompp, Michael Robert (2005), Tang China And The Collapse Of The Uighur Empire: A Documentary History, Brill
- Ebrey, Patricia Buckley (1999), The Cambridge Illustrated History of China, Cambridge: Cambridge University Press, ISBN 0-521-66991-X (paperback).
- Ebrey, Patricia Buckley; Walthall, Anne; Palais, James B. (2006), East Asia: A Cultural, Social, and Political History, Boston: Houghton Mifflin, ISBN 0-618-13384-4
- Golden, Peter B. (1992), An Introduction to the History of the Turkic Peoples: Ethnogenesis and State-Formation in Medieval and Early Modern Eurasia and the Middle East, OTTO HARRASSOWITZ · WIESBADEN
- Graff, David A. (2002), Medieval Chinese Warfare, 300-900, Warfare and History, London: Routledge, ISBN 0415239559
- Graff, David Andrew (2016), The Eurasian Way of War Military Practice in Seventh-Century China and Byzantium, Routledge, ISBN 978-0-415-46034-7.
- Haywood, John (1998), Historical Atlas of the Medieval World, AD 600-1492, Barnes & Noble
- Latourette, Kenneth Scott (1964), The Chinese, their history and culture, Volumes 1-2, Macmillan
- Lorge, Peter A. (2008), The Asian Military Revolution: from Gunpowder to the Bomb, Cambridge University Press, ISBN 978-0-521-60954-8
- Millward, James (2009), Eurasian Crossroads: A History of Xinjiang, Columbia University Press
- Needham, Joseph (1986), Science & Civilisation in China, vol. V:7: The Gunpowder Epic, Cambridge University Press, ISBN 0-521-30358-3
- Rong, Xinjiang (2013), Eighteen Lectures on Dunhuang, Brill
- Ryavec, Karl E. (2015), A Historical Atlas of Tibet
- Shaban, M. A. (1979), The ʿAbbāsid Revolution, Cambridge: Cambridge University Press, ISBN 0-521-29534-3
- Sima, Guang (2015), 柏楊版資治通鑑54皇后失蹤, Yuǎnliú chūbǎnshìyè gǔfèn yǒuxiàn gōngsī, ISBN 978-957-32-0876-1
- Skaff, Jonathan Karam (2012), Sui-Tang China and Its Turko-Mongol Neighbors: Culture, Power, and Connections, 580-800 (Oxford Studies in Early Empires), Oxford University Press
- van Schaik, Sam (2011), Tibet: A History, Yale University Press
- Tuttle, Gray (2013), The Tibetan History Reader, Columbia University Press
- Twitchett, Denis C. (1979), The Cambridge History of China, Vol. 3, Sui and T'ang China, 589–906, Cambridge University Press
- Twitchett, Denis (1994), "The Liao", The Cambridge History of China, Volume 6, Alien Regime and Border States, 907-1368, Cambridge: Cambridge University Press, pp. 43–153, ISBN 0521243319
- Twitchett, Denis (2009), The Cambridge History of China Volume 5 The Sung dynasty and its Predecessors, 907-1279, Cambridge University Press
- Wang, Zhenping (2013), Tang China in Multi-Polar Asia: A History of Diplomacy and War, University of Hawaii Press
- Whiting, Marvin C (2002), Imperial Chinese Military History, Writers Club Press
- Wilkinson, Endymion (2015). Chinese History: A New Manual, 4th edition. Cambridge, MA: Harvard University Asia Center distributed by Harvard University Press. ISBN 9780674088467.
- Yuan, Shu (2001), 柏楊版通鑑記事本末28第二次宦官時代, Yuǎnliú chūbǎnshìyè gǔfèn yǒuxiàn gōngsī, ISBN 957-32-4273-7
- Xiong, Victor Cunrui (2000), Sui-Tang Chang'an: A Study in the Urban History of Late Medieval China (Michigan Monographs in Chinese Studies), U OF M CENTER FOR CHINESE STUDIES, ISBN 0892641371
- Xiong, Victor Cunrui (2009), Historical Dictionary of Medieval China, United States of America: Scarecrow Press, Inc., ISBN 978-0810860537
- Xu, Elina-Qian (2005), HISTORICAL DEVELOPMENT OF THE PRE-DYNASTIC KHITAN, Institute for Asian and African Studies 7
- Xue, Zongzheng (1992), Turkic peoples, 中国社会科学出版社
