= Depal Khortsen =

Tibetan king

Depal Khortsen (Wylie: Lde-dpal-hkhor-btsan, c. 870 – 900) was a ruler of Tibet according to the Ladakhi Chronicles. He was a grandson of Langdarma and the father of Kyide Nyimagon. He was responsible for erecting eight early monasteries including an "Upper Mngahris" monastery (identity unknown). He also encouraged the mass production of copies of scriptures to spread religion.
