= Shey =

- Village
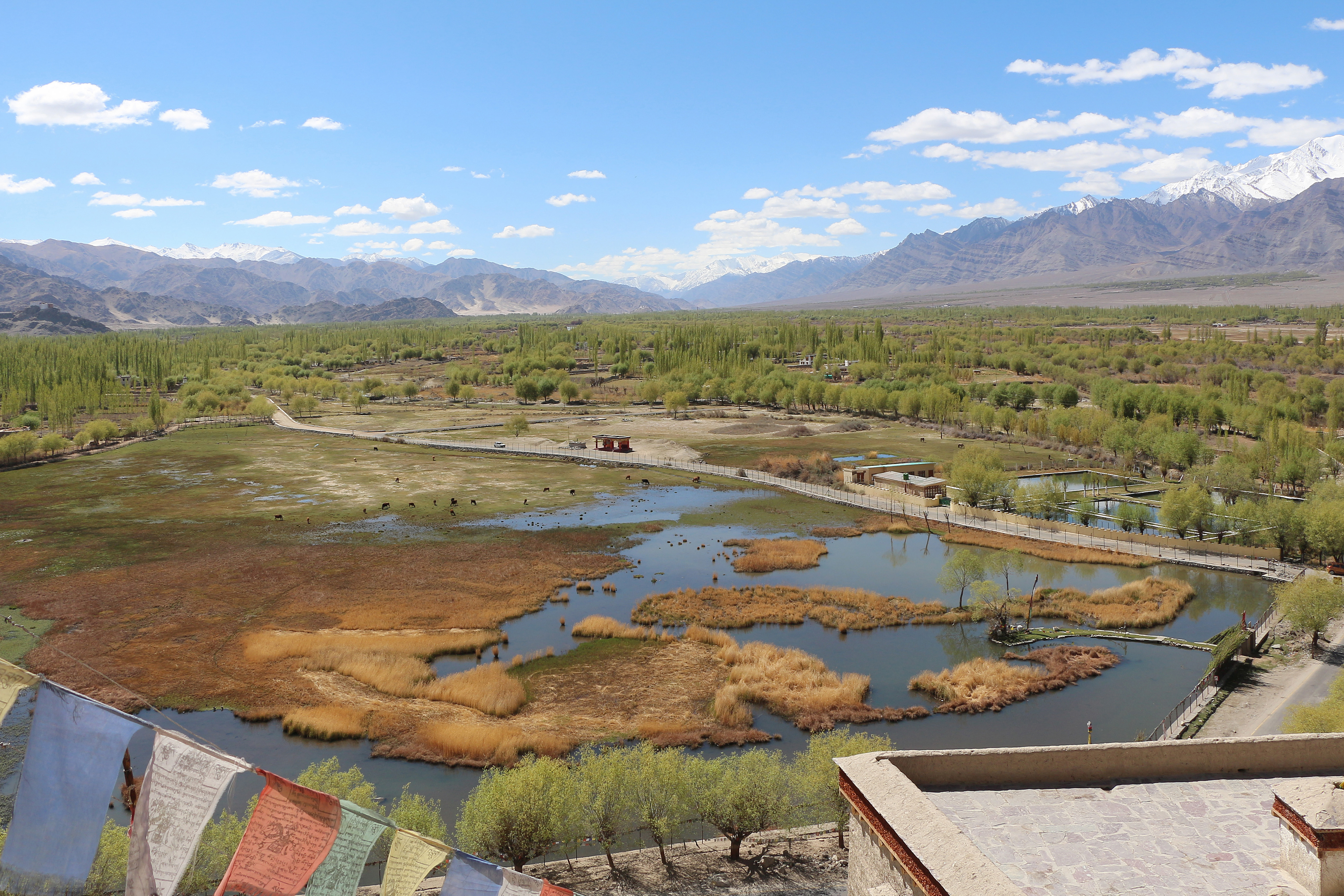
- View from Shey Palace

- Location in Ladakh, India Shey (Ladakh)
- Coordinates: 34.0731818°N 77.6392939°E
- Country: India
- Union Territory: Ladakh
- District: Leh
- Tehsil: Leh
- Elevation: 3,250 m (10,660 ft)

Population (2011)
  - Total: 2,238
- Time zone: UTC+5:30 (IST)
- 2011 census code: 858

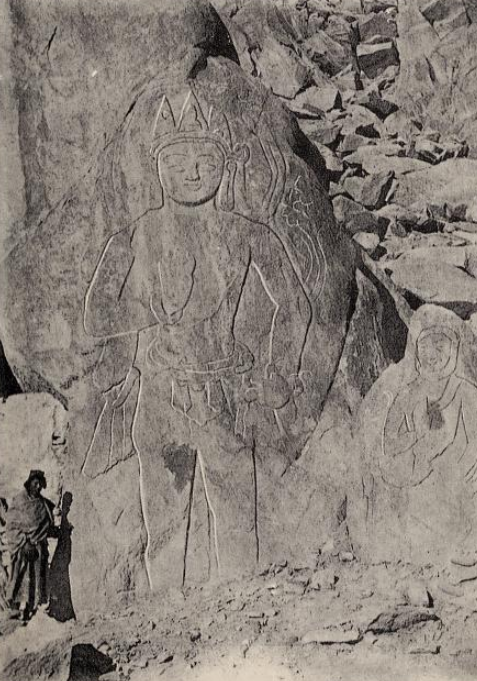
Sculptures of Maitreya at Shey, possibly raised by king Nyimagon circa 975 AD.

Shey is a village in the Leh district of Ladakh, India. It is located in the Leh tehsil, 15 km from Leh towards Hemis. Shey was founded as the summer capital of Ladakh (then called Maryul), by the king Lhachen Palgyigon in the 10th century, with Leh being winter capital. It was gradually eclipsed by Leh around the 17th century after the growth of Central Asian trade.

== History ==
Towards the end of the 9th century, the Tibetan prince Kyide Nyimagon (Skyid lde nyima gon), a great-grandson of the Tibetan king, Langdarma, established a small kingdom in Guge, which eventually grew to encompass the whole of western Tibet up to the Zoji La mountain pass. His eldest son, Lhachen Palgyigon, is credited with much of the conquest in the northwest. After his father's death, he inherited the region of Maryul ("lowland"), as Ladakh was then called.

Several towns and castles are said to have been founded by Nyimagon, and he apparently ordered the construction of the main sculptures at Shey. In an inscription, he says he had them made for the religious benefit of the Tsanpo (the dynastical name of his father and ancestors), and of all the people of Ngari (Western Tibet). This shows that already in this generation Langdarma's opposition to Buddhism had disappeared. Shey, just 15 km east of modern Leh, was the ancient seat of the Ladakhi kings.

== Geography ==
Shey is located in the upper Indus Valley, just 15 km east of the modern capital of Ladakh, Leh. It has an average elevation of 3,415 metres (11,204 feet).

Every year Sindhu Darshan Festival, is held here on the banks of the Indus River.

== Demographics ==
According to the 2011 census of India, Shey has 398 households. The effective literacy rate (i.e. the literacy rate of population excluding children aged 6 and below) is 78.95%.

Demographics (2011 Census)
	Total	Male	Female
Population	2238	1057	1181
Children aged below 6 years	257	146	111
Scheduled caste	0	0	0
Scheduled tribe	1935	931	1004
Literates	1564	750	814
Workers (all)	581	390	191
Main workers (total)	381	245	136
Main workers: Cultivators	9	9	0
Main workers: Agricultural labourers	8	6	2
Main workers: Household industry workers	1	1	0
Main workers: Other	363	229	134
Marginal workers (total)	200	145	55
Marginal workers: Cultivators	79	73	6
Marginal workers: Agricultural labourers	1	1	0
Marginal workers: Household industry workers	5	5	0
Marginal workers: Others	115	66	49
Non-workers	1657	667	990

== Education ==
The Druk White Lotus School, whose patrons include the 14th Dalai Lama and Richard Gere, is also located in Shey.
