= Kyide Nyimagon =

Founder of the Tibetan Ngari Khorsum Dynasty (?-930)

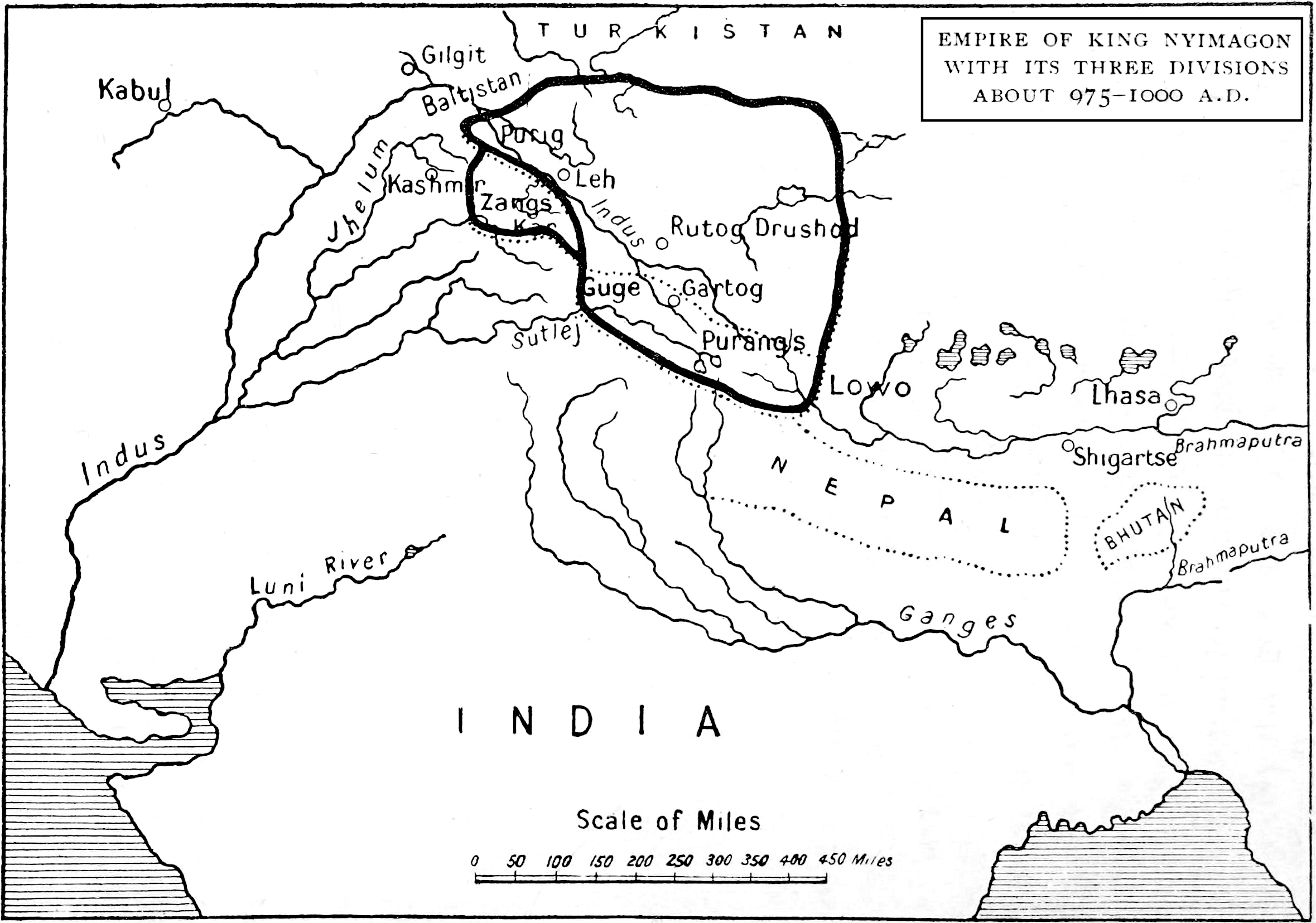
- Empire of King Nyimagon in 975

Ngari Khorsum

Maryul
- Successor: Lhachen Palgyigon

Guge-Purang
- Successor: Tashigön

Zanskar
- Successor: Detsukgön
- Born: Khri-skyid-lding; Lhasa
- Died: c. 930; Tsaparang
- Consort: 'K'or-skyon
- bo: སྐྱིད་ཨིདེ་ཉི་མ་མགོན
- Father: Depal Khortsen

Kyide Nyimagon
- Chinese: 吉德尼玛衮
Transcriptions
Standard Mandarin
- Hanyu Pinyin: jídé nímǎgǔn

Kyide Nyimagon (Tibetan: སྐྱིད་ལྡེ་ཉི་མ་མགོན, Wylie: skyid lde nyi ma mgon, THL: kyi dé nyi ma gön), whose original name was Khri-skyid-lding, was a member of the Yarlung dynasty of Tibet and a descendant of emperor Langdarma. He migrated to Western Tibet and founded the kingdom of Ngari Khorsum ("the three divisions of Ngari") around 912 CE. After his death in 930 CE, his large kingdom was divided among his three sons, giving rise to the three kingdoms of Maryul (Ladakh), Guge-Purang and Zanskar-Spiti.

== Family ==
After the assassination of the emperor Langdarma, the Tibetan empire entered a period of civil war over succession by Langdarma's two sons Yumtän (Yum-brtan) and Ösung ('Odsrung), which divided the empire into two parts. Ösung's son Depal Khortsen (c. 870–c. 910) is believed to have controlled most or part of Central Tibet.

Nyimagon was one of the sons of Depal Khortsen, the other being Trashi Tsentsän (bKraśis-brtsegs-brtsan). Both the sons fled Ü-Tsang (Central Tibet) in 910 when their father was murdered, at the end of the 3rd revolt in Ü-Tsang, which is taken to mark the beginning of the Tibetan Era of Fragmentation.

== Reign ==
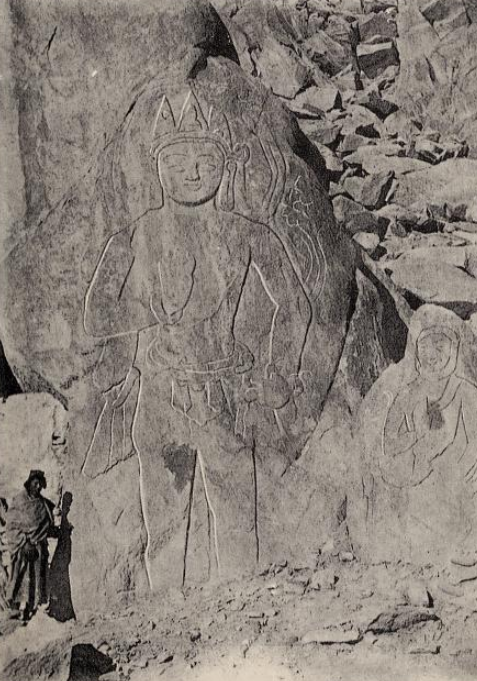
Sculptures of Maitreya at Shey, possibly raised by Nyimagon circa 975 AD.

According to Ladakhi chronicles, Nyimagon reached Tö Ngari ("Upper Ngari") with only a hundred followers. But within a comparatively short time he established a large kingdom spanning Ladakh, Zanskar, Lahul, Spiti, Guge and Purang.

Nyimagon established a small kingdom in Rala (Chinese: 热拉; pinyin: Rè lā), near Shiquanhe in the Sengge Zangbo valley, in or around 912. He is said to have started by building a Kharmar (reddish fort) at Rala in the Horse year, (Note: The ruins of a red fort claimed to have been built by Nyimagon are located at 32.48230°N 79.85917°E. A close-up photograph was published in Chinese National Geography.) another called Rtse-śp-rgya-ri in the Sheep year. The chronicles say he thought of causing many villages and hamlets to be built throughout the broad valleys of Dam and Lag (unidentified, but presumed to be connected to the Sutlej valley, later known as Guge). But he is said to have left Maryul (Ladakh) undisturbed.

After his establishment, Dge-bśes-btsan invited him to Purang and offered him his daughter 'Bro-za 'Khor-skyoṅ as wife. Nyimagon married her and had three sons. August Hermann Francke, who translated the Ladakhi Chronicles, proposed that 'Khor-skyoṅ must have been the only daughter of the king of Purang. After his death, Nyimagon must have inherited his kingdom in addition to his own territories.

Scholar Luciano Petech noted that the king of Purang belonged to the powerful 'Bro family of western Tibet, which had survived from the old Zhangzhung empire, and supplied queens and ministers to the Yarlung kings. The influence of wife's family as well as his own royal lineage would have contributed to Nyimagon's success in building a large kingdom.

The eldest son Palgyigon is seen to have expanded the kingdom to Ladakh, during the lifetime of his father. The land was at that time called Maryul and included Rudok.

== Succession ==
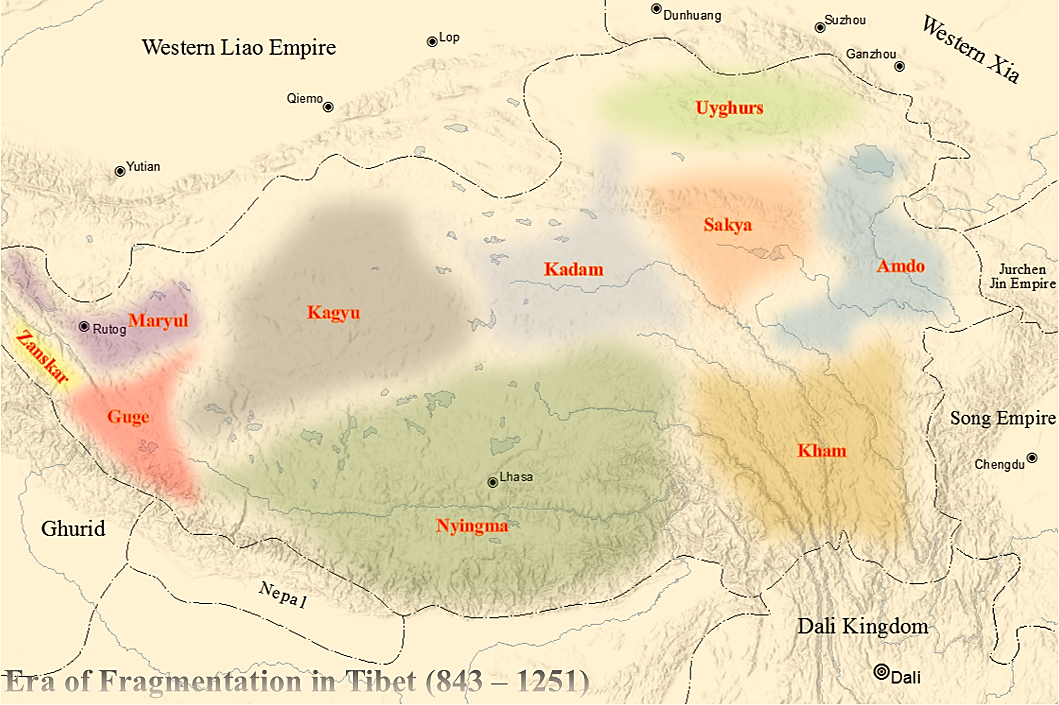
The three kingdoms of Ngari in fragmented Tibet

Nyimagon died around 930.

He divided his kingdom across his three sons. He gave Palgyigon (Wylie: dpal gyi mgon), his eldest son, the kingdom of Maryul (now known as Ladakh). His other two sons, Tashigön (Wylie: bkra sis mgon), and Detsukgön (Wylie: lde gtsug mgon) received the paternal estate, consisting of Guge-Purang and Zanskar-Spiti respectively. These three countries together came to be called "Ngari Khorsum".

Tashigön's son Yeshe-Ö, who inherited Guge-Purang in 967, abdicated in 975 and became a lama. He founded the Tholing Monastery, which became the premier centre for Buddhist learning and a key enabler of the Second diffusion of Buddhism to Tibet.

In Ladakh, the Tibetan language and culture came to replace the culture of Brokpa and Mons, through the rule of Nyimagon's descendants as well as the influence of Tibetan Buddhism.

== Bibliography ==
- Ahmad, Zahiruddin (1963), "Tibet and Ladakh: A History", Far Eastern Affairs, St. Antony's Papers, vol. 14, Chatto & Windus
- Di Mattia, Marialaura (Summer 1996), "Historical Profile of Ladakhi Religious Architecture", The Tibet Journal, 21 (2, Shaping the Mind: Artistic Facets of Tibetan Civilization), Library of Tibetan Works and Archives: 90–127, JSTOR 43302279
- Fisher, Margaret W.; Rose, Leo E.; Huttenback, Robert A. (1963), Himalayan Battleground: Sino-Indian Rivalry in Ladakh, Praeger, doi:10.2307/40199339, hdl:2027/mdp.39015010426792, JSTOR 40199339
- Francke, August Hermann (1907), A History of Western Tibet: One of the Unknown Empires, London: S.W. Partridge & Co
- Francke, August Hermann (1992) [1926], Antiquities of Indian Tibet, vol. 38, Volume 50 of New imperial series, Asian Educational Services, ISBN 81-206-0769-4
- Jahoda, Christian; Kalantari, Christiane (2015), "Kingship in Western Tibet in the 10th and 11th Centuries", Cahiers d'Extrême-Asie, 24, École française d'Extrême-Orient: 77–104, doi:10.3406/asie.2015.1315, JSTOR 24906071
- Hāṇḍā, Om Chanda (2001), Buddhist Western Himalaya: A Politico-Religious History, New Delhi: Indus Publishing, ISBN 978-81-7387-124-5
- Lo Bue, Erberto; Bray, John, eds. (2014), "Introduction", Art and Architecture in Ladakh: Cross-cultural Transmissions in the Himalayas and Karakoram, BRILL, ISBN 978-90-04-27180-7
  - Howard, Neil; Howard, Kath (2014), "Historic Ruins in the Gya Valley, Eastern Ladakh, and a Consideration of Their Relationship to the History of Ladakh and Maryul", Ibid, pp. 68–99, ISBN 9789004271807
- Le, Huu Phuoc (2010), Buddhist Architecture, Grafikol, ISBN 978-0-9844043-0-8
- McKay, Alex (2003), The History of Tibet, Vol. 1, Routledge Curzon, ISBN 9780415308427
- Petech, Luciano (1977), The Kingdom of Ladakh, c. 950–1842 A.D. (PDF), Instituto Italiano Per il Medio ed Estremo Oriente – via academia.edu
- Powers, John; Templeman, David (2012), Historical Dictionary of Tibet, Scarecrow Press, ISBN 978-0-8108-7984-3
- Ryavec, Karl E. (2015), A Historical Atlas of Tibet, University of Chicago Press, ISBN 978-0-226-24394-8
