= Nangqên County =

Nangqên County 囊谦县 · ནང་ཆེན་རྫོང་། Nangchen
- County
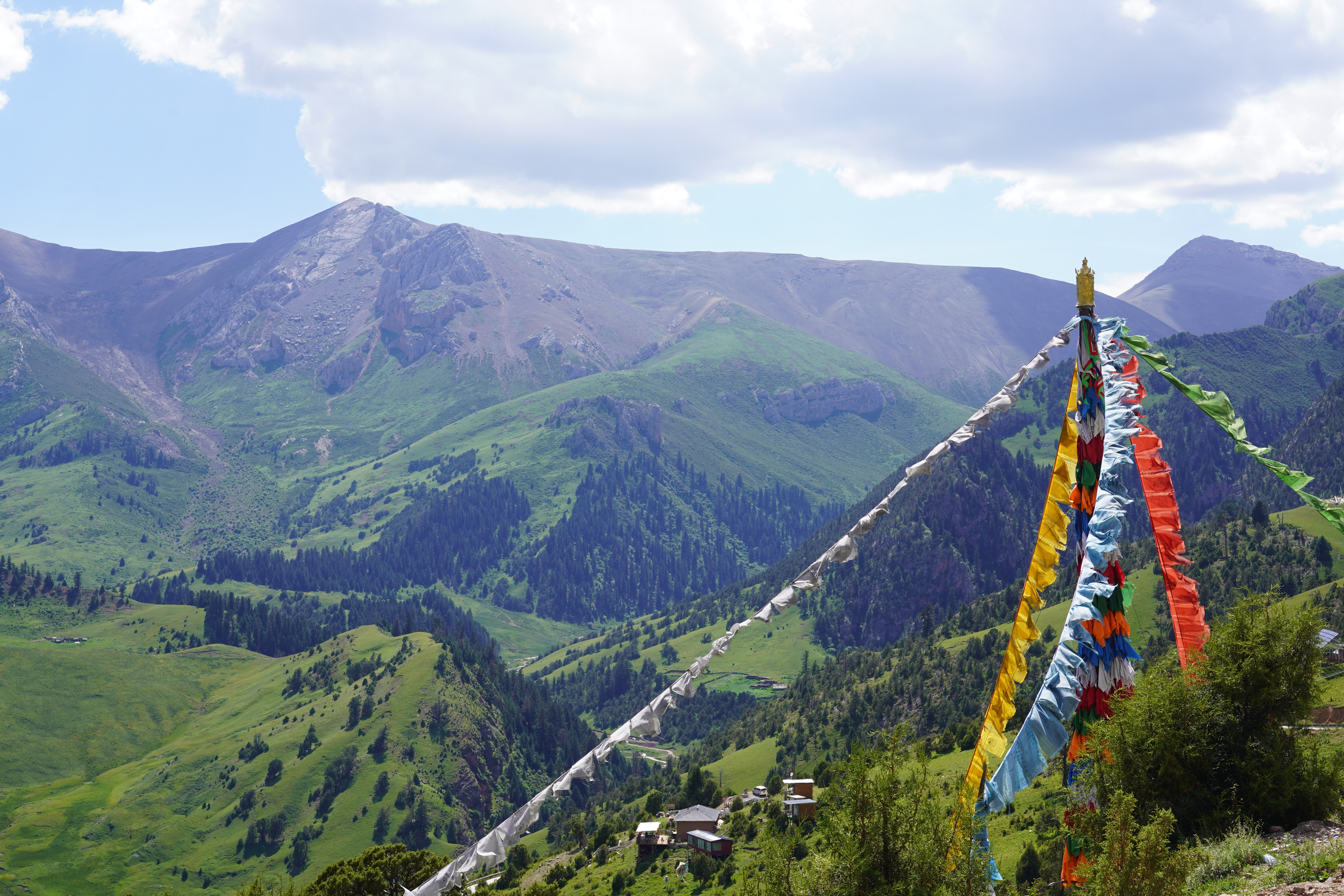

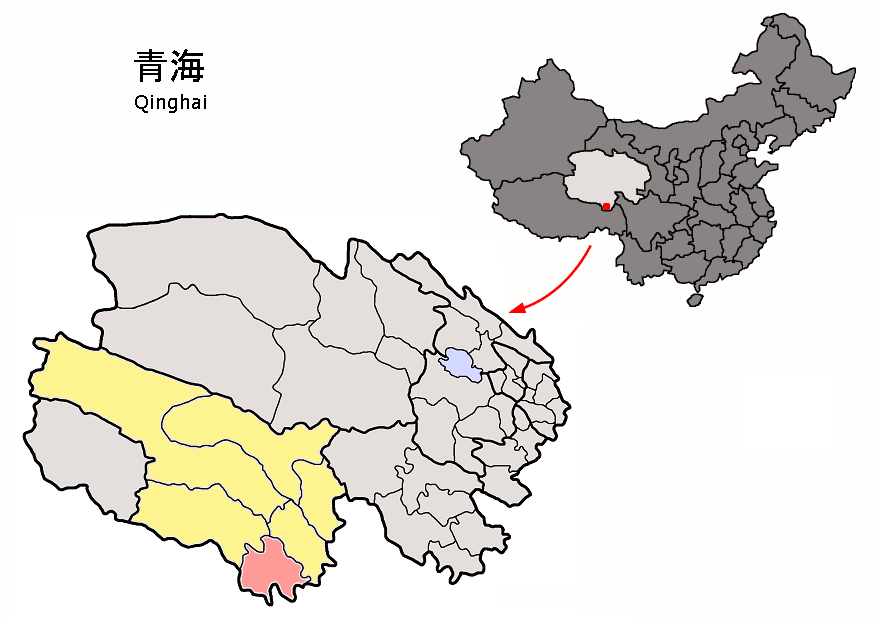
- Location of Nangqên County (red) within Yushu Prefecture (yellow) and Qinghai

- Location of the seat in Qinghai
- Coordinates: 32°12′11″N 96°28′52″E
- Country: China
- Province: Qinghai
- Autonomous prefecture: Yushu
- County seat: Xangda

Area
  - Total: 12,741 km^{2} (4,919 sq mi)

Population (2020)
  - Total: 90,307
  - Density: 7.0879/km^{2} (18.358/sq mi)
- Time zone: UTC+8 (China Standard)
- Postal code: 815200
- Website: www.nangqian.gov.cn

Nangqên County

Chinese name
- Simplified Chinese: 囊谦县
- Traditional Chinese: 囊謙縣
Transcriptions
Standard Mandarin
- Hanyu Pinyin: Nángqiān Xiàn

Tibetan name
- Tibetan: ནང་ཆེན་རྫོང་།
Transcriptions
- Wylie: nang chen rdzong
- Tibetan Pinyin: Nangqên Zong

Nangqên County, or Nangchen (Tibetan: ནང་ཆེན་རྫོང་།, Chinese: 囊谦县), is currently a county of the Yushu Tibetan Autonomous Prefecture and is the southernmost county-level division of Qinghai province, China, bordering the Tibet Autonomous Region to the south. Until 1955, the region was known as the Kingdom of Nangchen. It was one of the five kingdoms of the historical region of Do Kham.

The county seat is Sharnda, or Shamda (Tibetan: ཤར་མདའ་, Chinese : 香达, pinyin : Xiangda), built in a side valley and on the right bank of the Dza Chu (upper reaches of the Mekong). In 2000, the county's population amounted to 57,387 people, inhabiting a surface of 11,539 km^{2} (4,455 sq mi).

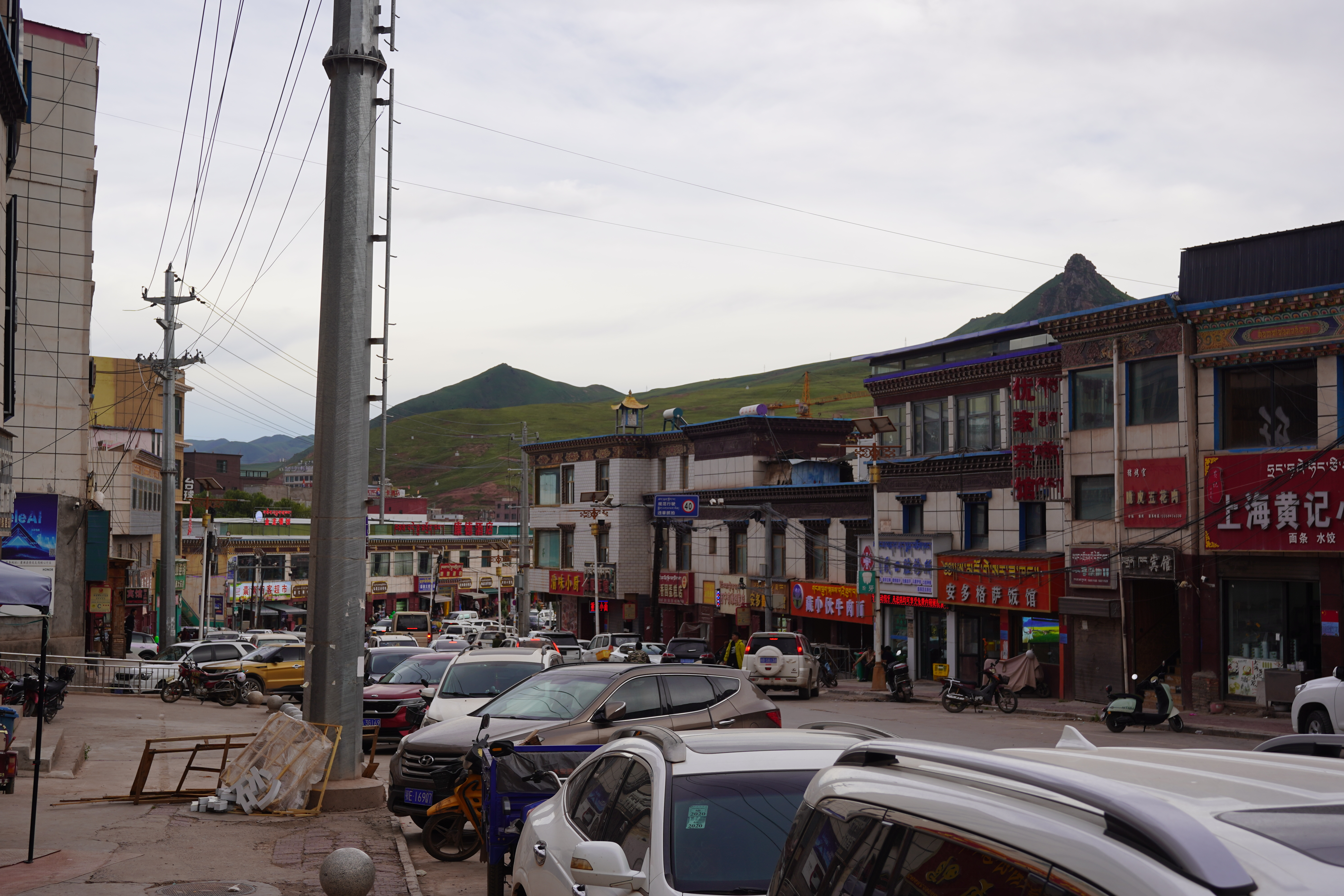
Sharnda city center

== History ==
The county's name is derived from the former king (nang chen rgyal po) and Kingdom of Nangchen, a tribal confederation that emerged as a unified Buddhist kingdom in the 13th century. The present-day's county comprises the core area of the old kingdom of Nangchen.

Memories of the Kingdom of Nangchen play a role among Tibetan refugees who came to India from the area. Scholar Maria Turek reported that in 2015 she heard about “a man who went to various Tibetan communities in India, introducing himself as ‘the king of Nangchen’ not without some success, even though he had no credentials to prove his claim.”

The last king of Nangchen, Tashi Tsewang, stayed in power in the region after the 1955 official disestablishment of the Kingdom. Between 1956 and 1959, he sent soldiers fighting against communist Chinese in the Kham rebellion, a troubled episode before the 1959 Tibetan uprising. He died during the Cultural revolution.

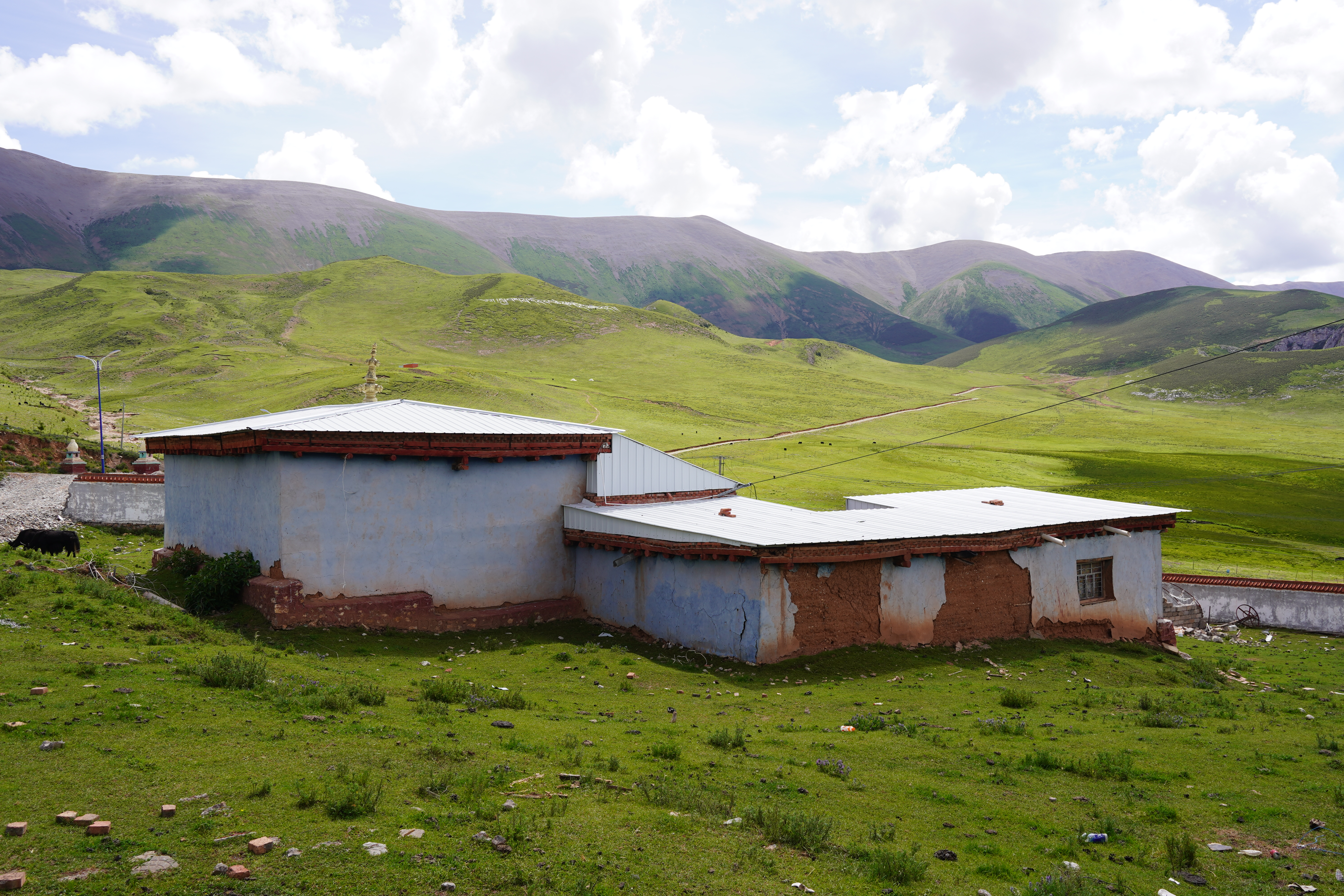
House of the last King of Nangchen, located at Tsechu monastery.

A Yelpa Kagyu monastery, Tana Monastery (Jang Tana), was founded by Yelpa Yeshe Tsek in 1068. It is considered a branch monastery of Tsurpu.

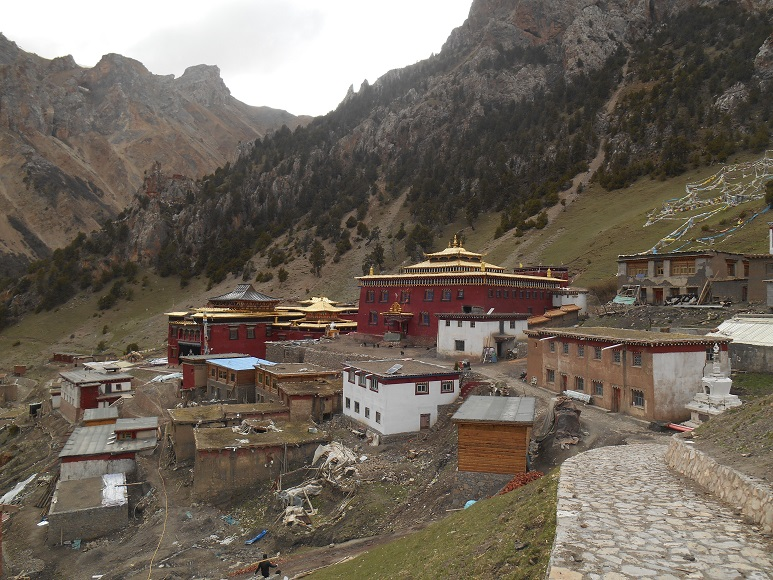
Tana Monastery (Jang Tana)

== Culture ==
While most of Qinghai Tibetans are of Amdo culture, Nangchen, and more broadly the Yushu prefecture, is of Kham culture and its people speak Kham dialect.

Most of Tibetan areas are dominated by the Gelug movement (often called yellow-hats) of Tibetan buddhism, but in Nangchen, the Kagyu movement (part of the red-hats) is the majority.

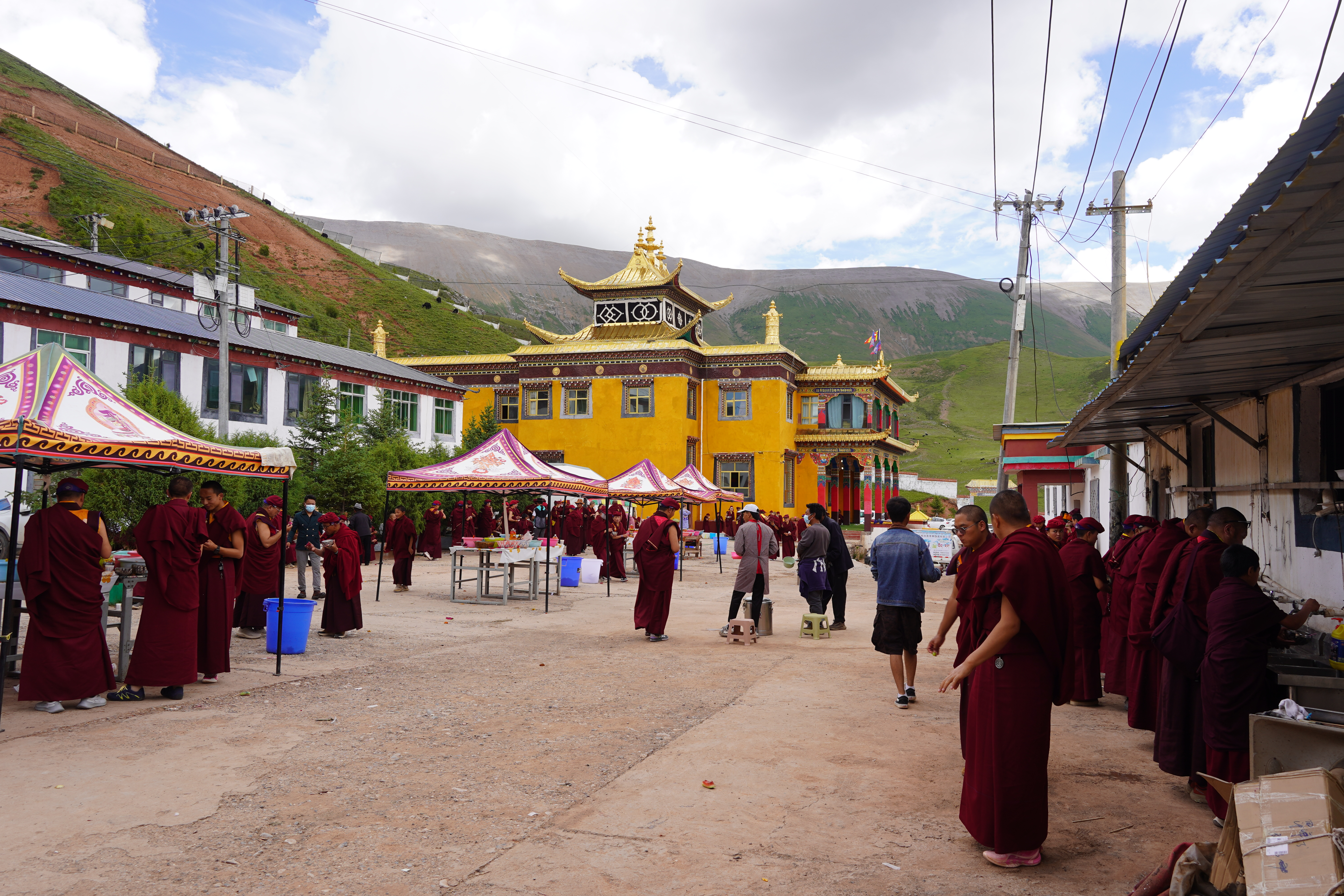
Kagyupa monks in Tsechu monastery (Caijiu in Chinese), Nangchen county.

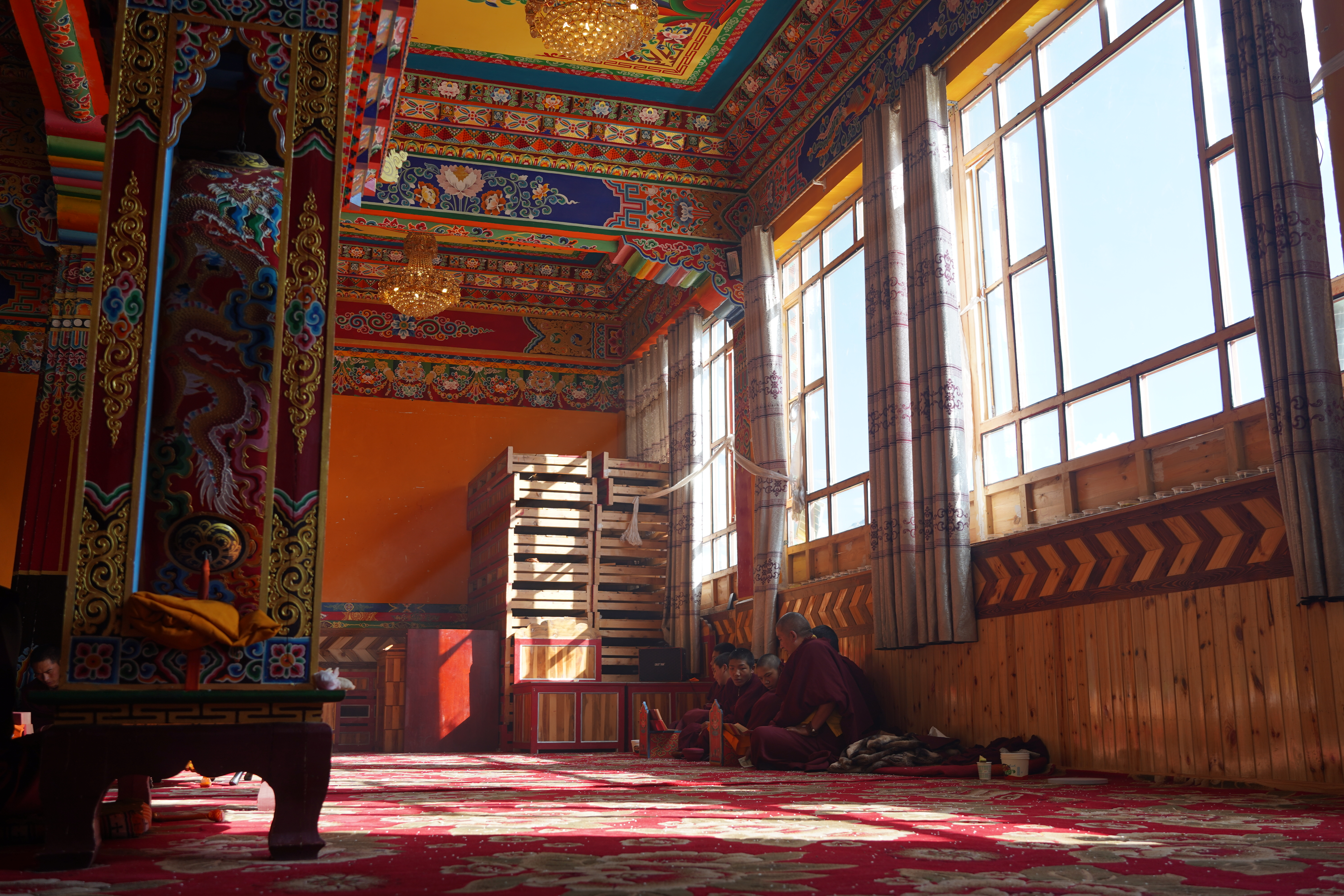
Gar monastery (Kagyu school), Nangchen county.

== Administrative divisions ==
Name	Simplified Chinese	Hanyu Pinyin	Tibetan	Wylie	Administrative division code
Town
Xangda Town (Xarda, Xiangda)	香达镇	Xiāngdá Zhèn	ཤར་མདའ་གྲོང་རྡལ།	shar mda' grong rdal	632725100
Townships
Zhêca Township (Baizha, Bêca)	白扎乡	Báizhā Xiāng	སྤྲེལ་ཚྭ་ཞང་།	sprel tshwa zhang	632725200
Jiqu Township	吉曲乡	Jíqǔ Xiāng	ལྕི་ཆུ་ཞང་།	lci chu zhang	632725201
Nyagla Township (Niangla)	娘拉乡	Niánglā Xiāng	ཉག་ར་ཞང་།	nyag ra zhang	632725202
Mozhong Township (Maozhuang)	毛庄乡	Máozhuāng Xiāng	མོའོ་གྲོང་ཞང་།	mo'o grong zhang	632725203
Gyozhag Township (Juela)	觉拉乡	Juélā Xiāng	སྐྱོ་བྲག་ཞང་།	skyo brag zhang	632725204
Domba Township (Dongba)	东坝乡	Dōngbà Xiāng	སྡོམ་པ་ཞང་།	sdom pa zhang	632725205
Gaxung Township (Gayang)	尕羊乡	Gǎyáng Xiāng	ཀ་གཞུང་ཞང་།	ka gzhung zhang	632725206
Ji'nyinsib Township (Jinisai)	吉尼赛乡	Jínísài Xiāng	ལྕི་ཉིན་སྲིབ་ཞང་།	lci nyin srib zhang	632725207
Zhongxog Township (Zhogxog, Zhuoxiao)	着晓乡	Zhuóxiǎo Xiāng	འབྲོང་ཤོག་ཞང་།	'brong shog zhang	632725208

== Climate ==
Nangqên has a dry-winter humid continental climate (Köppen Dwb) featuring freezing, clear and dry winters, mild, rainy and cloudier summers, and substantial diurnal temperature variation throughout the year.

Climate data for Nangqên, elevation 3,644 m (11,955 ft), (1991–2020 normals, extremes 1981–2010)
Month	Jan	Feb	Mar	Apr	May	Jun	Jul	Aug	Sep	Oct	Nov	Dec	Year
Record high °C (°F)	18.3 (64.9)	17.1 (62.8)	23.8 (74.8)	24.2 (75.6)	25.7 (78.3)	28.7 (83.7)	29.0 (84.2)	28.3 (82.9)	25.4 (77.7)	24.6 (76.3)	18.5 (65.3)	16.1 (61.0)	29.0 (84.2)
Mean daily maximum °C (°F)	4.0 (39.2)	6.5 (43.7)	9.7 (49.5)	13.4 (56.1)	17.0 (62.6)	19.4 (66.9)	21.3 (70.3)	21.2 (70.2)	18.8 (65.8)	13.4 (56.1)	8.9 (48.0)	5.4 (41.7)	13.3 (55.9)
Daily mean °C (°F)	−5.2 (22.6)	−2.0 (28.4)	1.7 (35.1)	5.3 (41.5)	9.1 (48.4)	12.3 (54.1)	14.1 (57.4)	13.7 (56.7)	10.9 (51.6)	5.3 (41.5)	−0.3 (31.5)	−4.3 (24.3)	5.1 (41.2)
Mean daily minimum °C (°F)	−12.3 (9.9)	−9.0 (15.8)	−5.0 (23.0)	−1.2 (29.8)	2.9 (37.2)	7.0 (44.6)	8.7 (47.7)	8.2 (46.8)	5.6 (42.1)	−0.1 (31.8)	−6.8 (19.8)	−11.3 (11.7)	−1.1 (30.0)
Record low °C (°F)	−23.2 (−9.8)	−20.8 (−5.4)	−16.8 (1.8)	−10.7 (12.7)	−8.1 (17.4)	−1.7 (28.9)	−0.6 (30.9)	−1.8 (28.8)	−3.6 (25.5)	−10.6 (12.9)	−17.2 (1.0)	−25.8 (−14.4)	−25.8 (−14.4)
Average precipitation mm (inches)	3.1 (0.12)	3.8 (0.15)	8.7 (0.34)	18.6 (0.73)	59.0 (2.32)	122.3 (4.81)	112.4 (4.43)	99.9 (3.93)	86.5 (3.41)	34.3 (1.35)	4.5 (0.18)	1.4 (0.06)	554.5 (21.83)
Average precipitation days (≥ 0.1 mm)	2.8	3.4	5.5	10.5	16.5	22.5	20.7	18.1	19.2	12.5	2.9	1.5	136.1
Average snowy days	5.0	6.5	9.9	12.4	5.0	0.3	0.1	0	0.4	8.3	4.8	3.1	55.8
Average relative humidity (%)	39	37	40	47	55	65	67	66	68	63	48	40	53
Mean monthly sunshine hours	210.6	189.1	206.7	208.9	226.0	198.4	212.7	211.0	204.9	208.1	223.0	226.8	2,526.2
Percentage possible sunshine	66	60	55	53	53	47	49	52	56	60	72	73	58
Source: China Meteorological Administration

== Transportation ==
- China National Highway 214
