= Lhalung Pelgyi Dorje =

9th-century Tibetan Buddhist monk

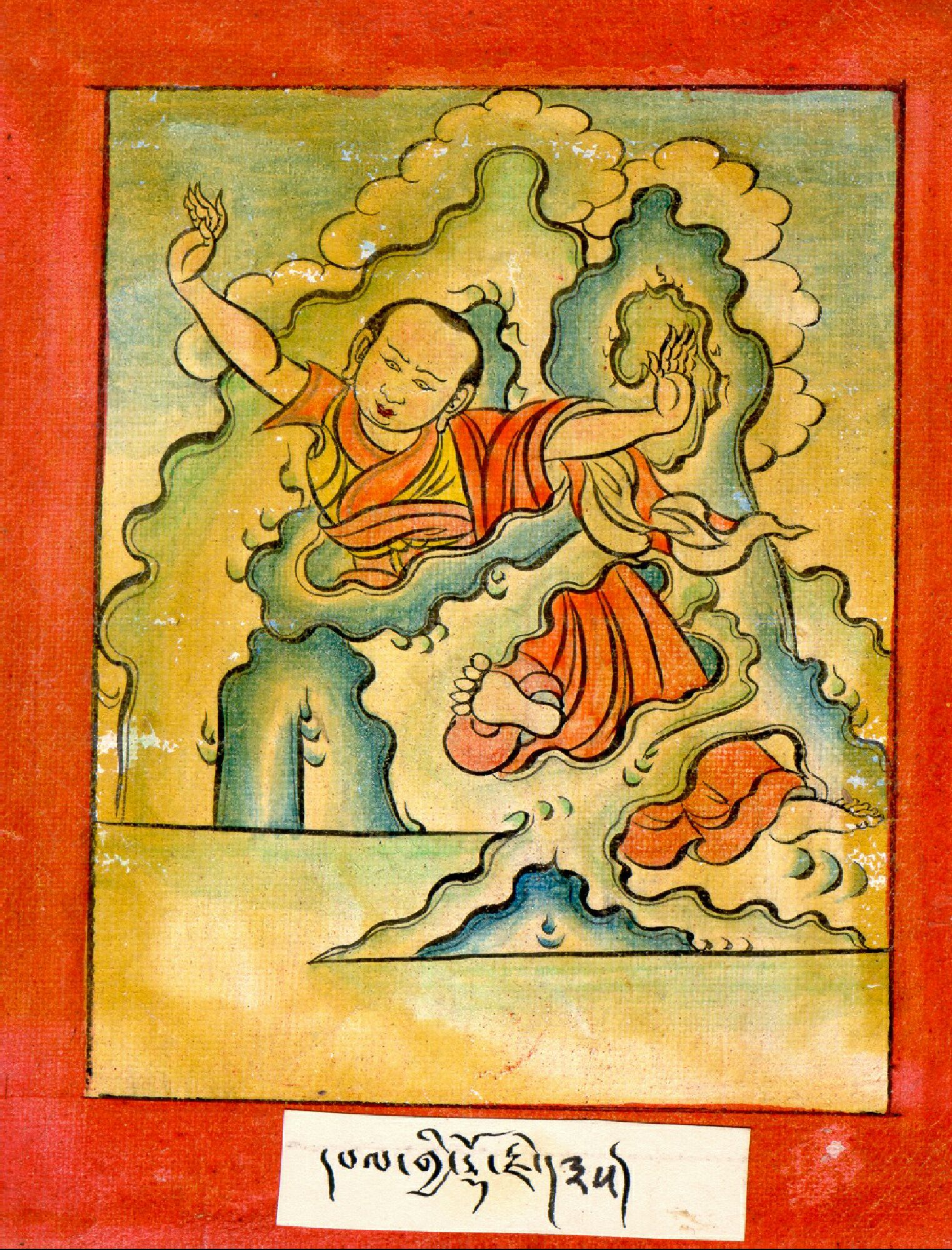
Lhalung Pelgyi Dorje

Lhalung Pelgyi Dorje (Standard Tibetan: ལྷ་ལུང་དཔལ་གྱི་རྡོ་རྗེ། Wylie: lha lung dpal gyi rdo rje) was a Tibetan Buddhist monk and Padmasambhava's student. He is credited with assassinating the Tibetan King Langdarma in 842 CE in order to protect the buddhadharma.

According to Tibetan sources, King Langdarma persecuted Vajrayana Buddhism in Tibet. To end this persecution, Pelgyi Dorje traveled to the King's palace, where he surprised the King and killed him with a bow and arrow. Escaping by turning his black cloak inside out to show its white lining and riding his white horse into the river to wash off the charcoal with which he had made it appear black, he then fled to Amdo or Yerpa, where he lived out the rest of his life as a recluse.

Another version relates how he performed the role of the Black Hat Dancer in the Black Hat Dance; dressed in black with a tall black hat he was able to shoot the king dead with a bow and arrow. He escaped and turned his clothing inside out as it was lined with white stuff; his white horse had been stained with soot which soon washed off in a river so the pursuit was rendered futile.

The assassination story is mentioned in several sources and regarded as a historical fact. After committing his regicide, he fled to Amdo and thereafter refused to ordain new monks, no longer considering himself qualified to do so after having committed an act of murder that broke his Vinaya vows.
