= Zuiho Yamaguchi =

Japanese Buddhologist and Tibetologist (1926–2023)

Yamaguchi Zuihō
- Born: February 21, 1926; Wajima, Ishikawa, Japan
- Died: April 15, 2023 (aged 97); Tokyo, Japan
- Resting place: Tokyo, Japan
- Other names: 山口瑞鳳, 川尻博(Hiroshi Kawajiri)
- Occupations: Buddhologist, Tibetologist

Zuiho Yamaguchi (山口 瑞鳳, Yamaguchi Zuihō; 21 February 1926 – 15 April 2023) was a Japanese Buddhologist and Tibetologist. He was an emeritus professor at the University of Tokyo, where he also took his doctorate degree in Sanskrit in 1954. He also studied in Paris and for many years was a researcher at the Tōyō Bunko. He retired in 1986.

== Biography ==
Zuihō Yamaguchi was born in Monzen, Ishikawa prefecture. He graduated the First High school in 1950. He entered University of Tokyo, and majored in Sanskrit and Indian philosophy. He entered the graduate school of the same university after his graduation in 1953.

He left the graduate school and went to France in 1956. He started visiting in French National Centre for Scientific Research. After 1962, he became a researcher supported by the Rockefeller Foundation and studied at l'École pratique des hautes études.

He came back to Japan in 1964, and started working in Tōyō Bunko, Tokyo. He became an assistant professor of University of Tokyo in 1970, and was promoted to professor in 1979. Zuihō specialized in the history of Tibet. His studies included the manuscripts of Dunhuang (Dunhuangologie), but also dealt with other subjects, such as the Tibetan calendar which he published a work in 1973 in Japanese. He also did a thorough investigation of facts surrounding emperor Langdarma, where he challenged the assertion that Langdarma was a persecutor of Buddhism and a supporter of Bon.

Zuihō died from pneumonia on 15 April 2023, at the age of 97.

== Bibliography ==
=== Books ===
- "Tales of Mahabharata"『マハーバーラタものがたり』 (青葉書房, 1957)
- "List of the Tibetan text gathered by Sir Marc Aurel Stein"『オーレル・スタイン蒐集チベット語文献解題目録』 (Tōyō Bunko, 1977–78)
- "Genesis of Tibetan Empire"『吐蕃王国成立史研究』 (Iwanami Shoten, 1983)
- "Tibetan Buddhism and society" 『チベットの仏教と社会』 (Shunjyu-sya, 1986)
- チベット. 東洋叢書 3. Vol. 上. 東京大学出版会. June 1987. ISBN 4-13-013033-1.
- チベット. 東洋叢書 4. Vol. 下 (改訂版 ed.). 東京大学出版会. June 2004. ISBN 4-13-013049-8.
- チベット語文語文法 春秋社, 1998
- 「概説」チベット語文語文典 春秋社, 2002
- 「要訣」チベット語文語文典 Institute of Buddhism studies at Narita-san, 2003
- 「評説」インド仏教 哲学史 岩波書店, 2010

=== Translations in Japanese ===
- "Tibetian culture"『チベットの文化』" Rolf Stein (translation: Zuihō Yamaguchi, Akira Sadakata(定方晟), Iwanami Shoten, 1971)

=== Essays ===
- CiNii>山口瑞鳳
- INBUDS>山口瑞鳳

== About Zuihō Yamaguchi ==
- 福田洋一「日本のチベット学10年—山口瑞鳳博士の研究を中心に」『仏教学』36, 1994. ("Ten years of Japanese Tibetian studies: Especially of Achievements by Zuihō Yamaguchi", "Buddhism study"36)
