= Gusiluo =

Gusiluo (Tibetan: རྒྱལ་སྲས་, Wylie: rgyal sras; simplified Chinese: 唃厮啰; traditional Chinese: 唃廝囉; 997–1065) was a Tibetan king of Tsongkha, in present-day Qinghai and parts of Hexi Corridor. Claimed to be a descendant of Buddha, Guosiluo laid a foundation to a large Tibetan confederacy centered in Zongge (present-day Ping'an District). Guosiluo's kingdom built a closed relationship with the Khitans to resist the increasing powerful Western Xia. In 1099, the Northern Song launched a campaign into Xining and Haidong (in modern Qinghai province), occupying territory that was controlled by Guosiluo since the 10th century.

== See also ==
- Pre-Imperial Tibet
