= Mangnang Monastery =

Former monastery in Tibet

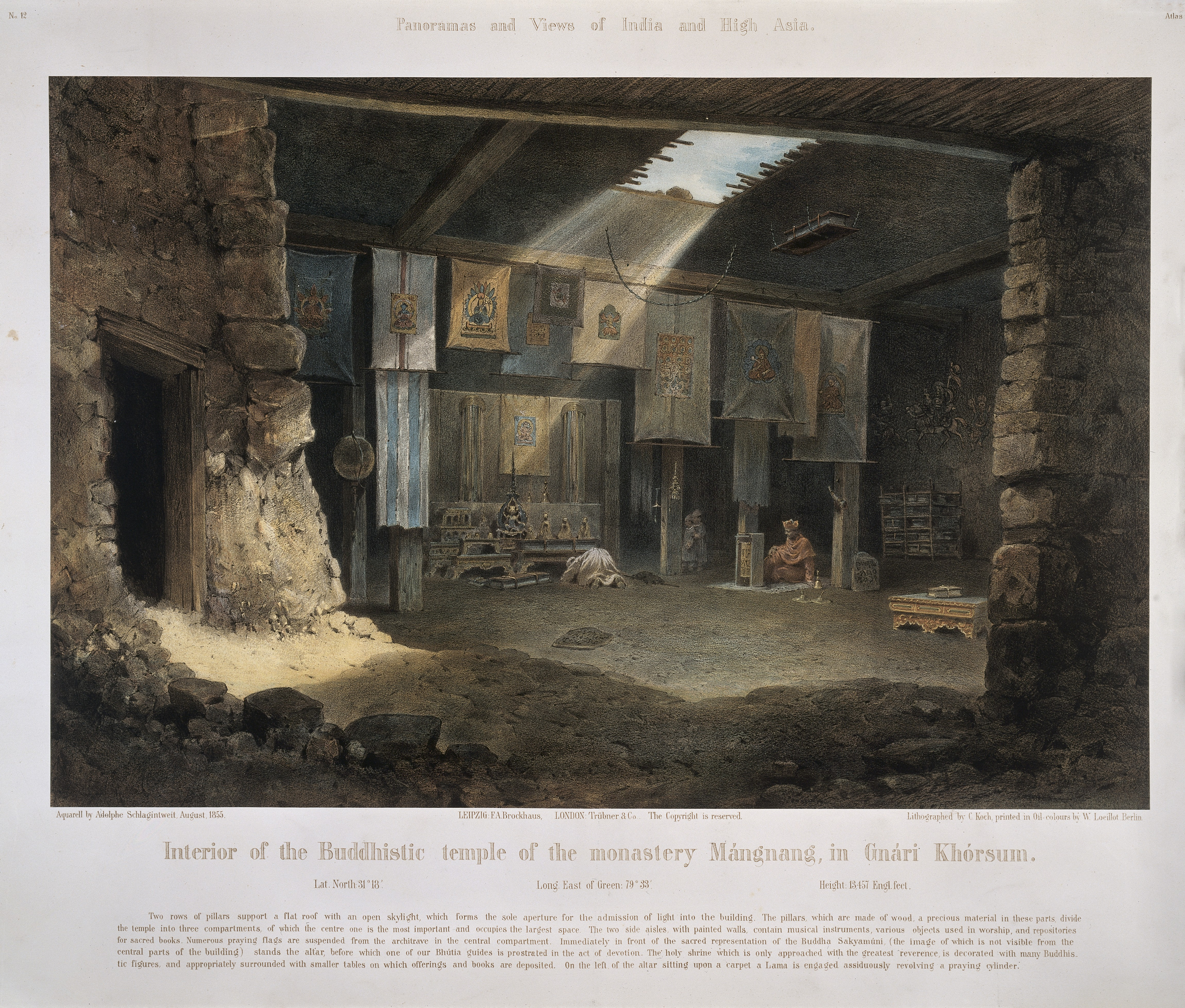
- Mangnang Monastery in 1866

- Location within Tibet

Religion
- Affiliation: Tibetan Buddhism

Location
- Location: Ngari Prefecture, Tibet
- Country: China
- Interactive map of Mangnang Monastery
- Coordinates: 31°21′3.6″N 79°47′13.2″E

Architecture
- Established: 11th century

Mangnang Monastery (Chinese: 芒囊寺) was a Buddhist monastery in western Tibet. Founded in the 1037, it was visited by the British in 1866, who photographed it. The photographs are now part of the Royal Geographical Society. The monastery was probably destroyed in 1959.
