= Kingdom of Nangchen =

Kingdom

Kingdom of Nangchen ནང་ཆེན་རྒྱལ་པོ 囊谦土司
- 1175–1955
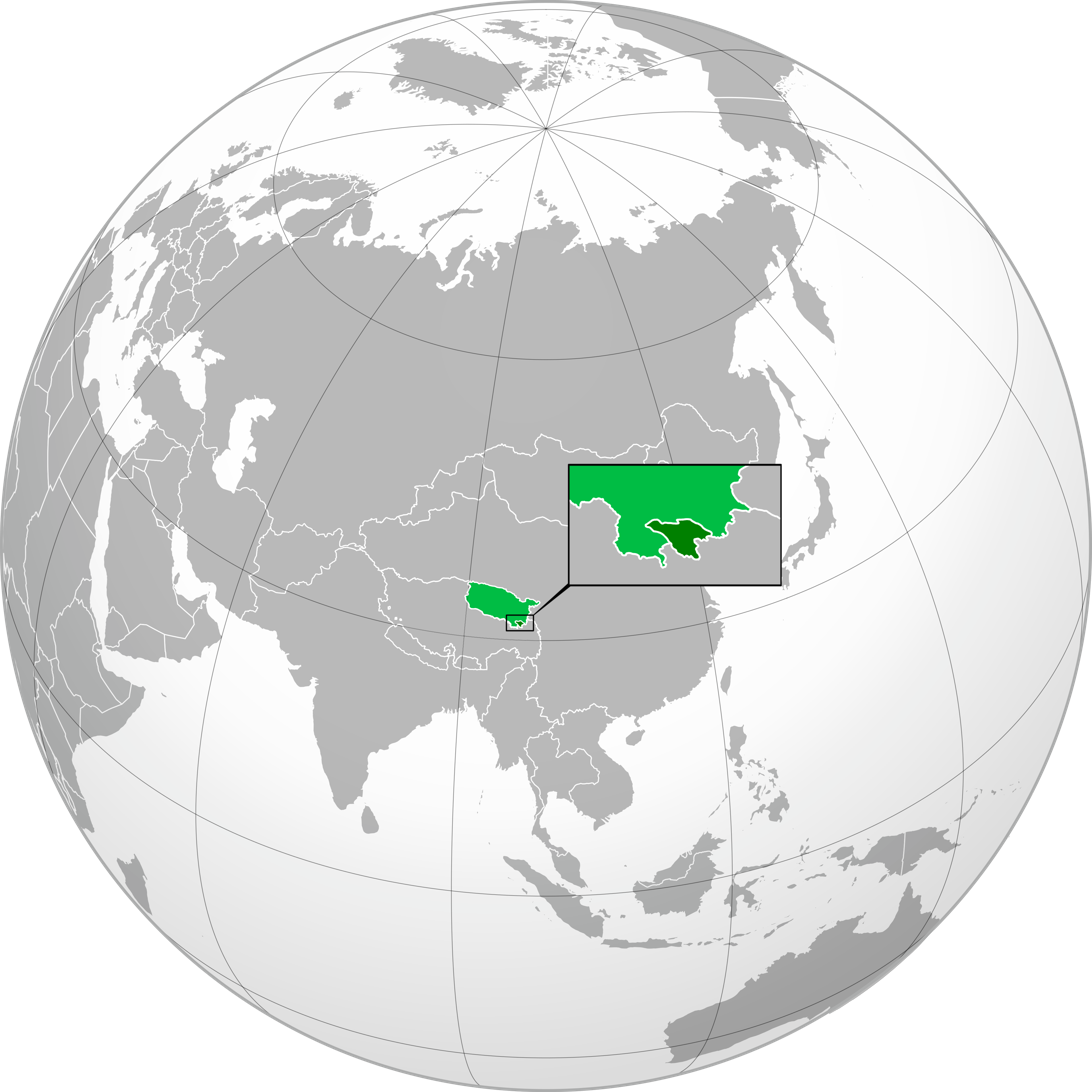
- Controlled territory Influence
- Capital: Nangqên
- Religion: Buddhism
- Government: Tusi chiefdom
- Tusi
  - 1175-?: Wa Alu
  - ?-1949: Tashi Tsewang Dorje (last)
- History
  - Established: 1175
  - Disestablished: 1955
Succeeded by
Qinghai
- Today part of: China

The Kingdom of Nangchen (Tibetan: ནང་ཆེན་རྒྱལ་པོ, Wylie: nang chen rgyal po; Chinese: 囊谦土司), also known as the Kingdom of Nangqian, was a Tibetan tusi in what is now Nangqen County, in the Yushu Tibetan Autonomous Prefecture. It existed from 1175 to 1955, when it was abolished as part of reforms made after the communist victory in the Chinese Civil War.

== History ==
The kingdom was founded in 1175 by Wa Alu, the 47th generation leader of the Nangqian family. In the same year, he became King of Nangchen, and declared loyalty to the Southern Song. In 1239 the kingdom was invaded by Godan Khan and annexed, but later the Yuan dynasty recognized the Kingdom. In the early years of the Qing dynasty, the kingdom was invaded by the Kingdom of Baili. The invasion was repelled with the assistance of the Khoshut Khanate, led by Güshi Khan. From then until 1726, Nancheng paid tribute to Tibet. After Tibet was incorporated into China, the Qing appointed the king of Nangchen as the Qianhu of Nangchen, Chengduo and Yushu, under the jurisdiction of Xining. In 1862, Tutsi Zhan was usurped by Gonpo Namgyal, the leader of a rebel Tibetan army. Nancheng later assisted the Qing in suppressing Namgyal's revolt.

In 1914, during the reign of the 70th Tusi, Nangchen experienced turmoil as a result of its dispute with the Kingdom of Derge over Chengdu. Derge was subordinate to Sichuan, while Nangchen was subordinate to Qinghai. The Sichuan clique attempted to coerce Nangchen into joining them, while the Ma clique sent troops to support the kingdom. In the end the Beiyang government demarcated the border and concluded that Nangchen was to return to Xining. In 1932, the kingdom was invaded by Tibet, and did not resist. Later, Nangchen was recaptured by the Ma.

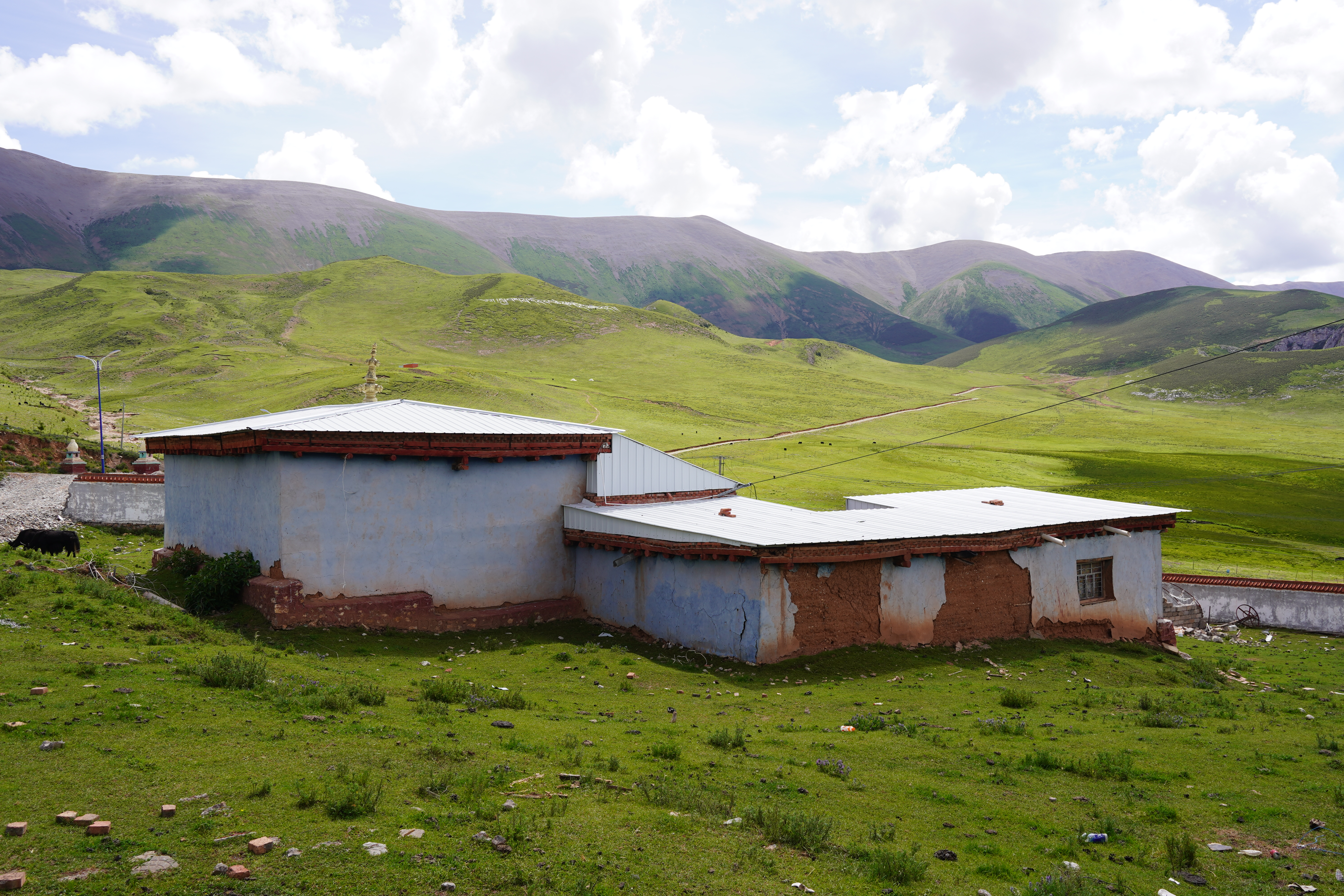
House of the last King of Nangchen, located at Tsechu monastery, in Nangqên county

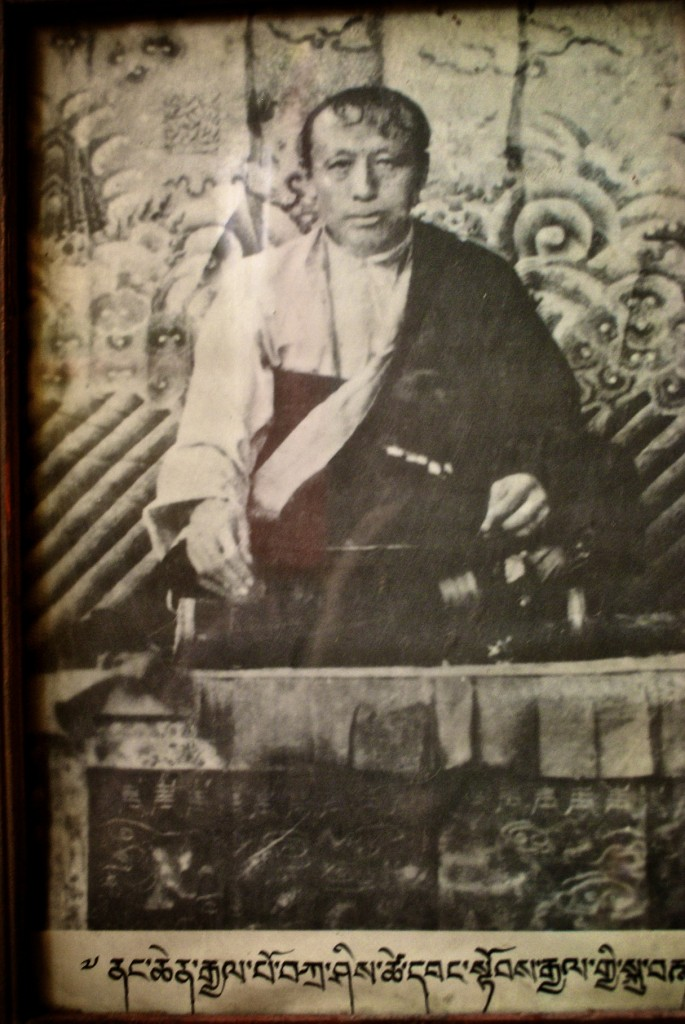
Tashi Tsewang Dorje

In September 1949, the last Tusi of Nangchen, Tashi Tsewang Dorje, after learning that the People's Liberation Army had captured Xining, ordered his subordinates to join the Chinese Communist Party. In 1955, the Tusi system was abolished, and the kingdom became what is now Nangqen County.
