= Lhachen Palgyigon =

1st Maryul Tibetan ruler (930-960)

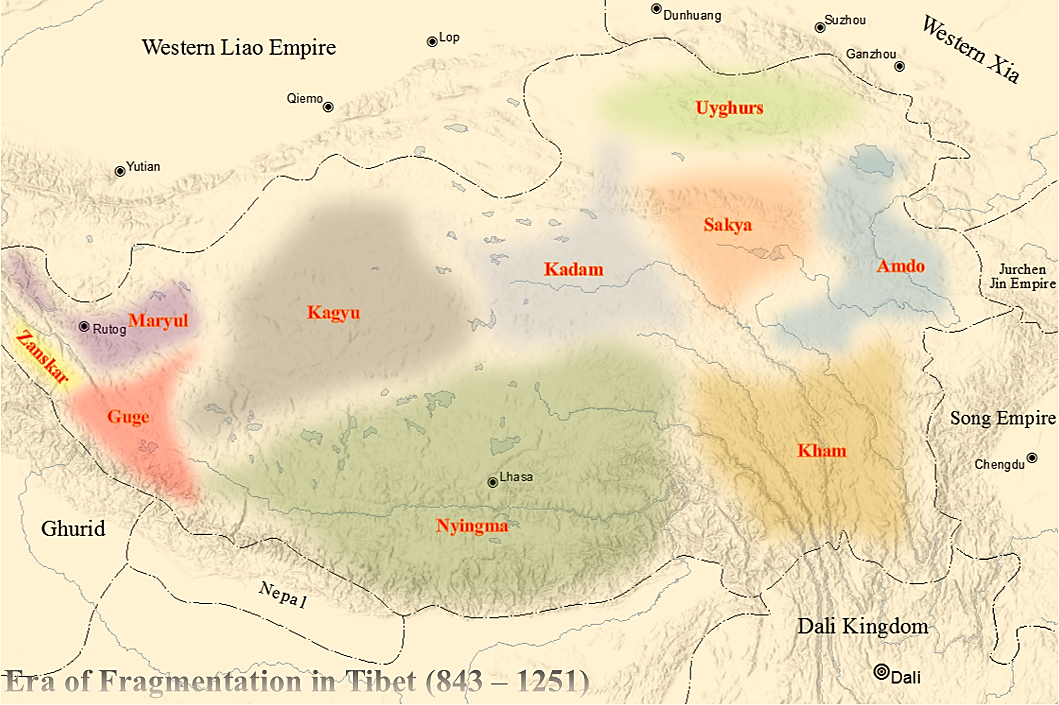
Maryul in the fragmented Tibetan Empire c. 900

Lhachen Palgyigon (c. 930 – c. 960) (Tibetan: དཔལ་གྱི་མགོན, Wylie: dpal gyi mgon) was the founding king of the Kingdom of Maryul, based in modern Ladakh.

Palgyigon was a son of Kyide Nyimagon, a descendant of the Old Tibetan dynasty, who unified the Western Tibet (Ngari) during the Tibetan Era of Fragmentation. Palgyigon was the eldest of three brothers, the other two being Trashigon and Detsukgon.

Palgyigon is said to have extended the kingdom of his father to the "Kashmir pass" (Zoji La) in the northwest, along what were referred to as the "lowlands of Ngari" (mar-yul of mṅah‐ris). He became an independent king after his father's death. The other two sons of Nyimagon, Trashigon and Detsukgon, also inherited the kingdoms of Guge‐Purang and Zanskar, respectively. The three kingdoms together were referred to as "Ngari Korsum" (Wylie: mNga' ris skor gsum, "the three divisions of Ngari").

The kingdom of Maryul lasted until 1842 when the Dogra general Zorawar Singh, having conquered it, made it part of the princely state of Jammu and Kashmir.

== Bibliography ==
- Emmer, Gerhard (2007), "Dga' ldan tshe dbang dpal bzang po", Proceedings of the Tenth Seminar of the IATS, 2003. Volume 9: The Mongolia-Tibet Interface: Opening New Research Terrains in Inner Asia, BRILL, ISBN 978-90-474-2171-9
- Fisher, Margaret W.; Rose, Leo E.; Huttenback, Robert A. (1963), Himalayan Battleground: Sino-Indian Rivalry in Ladakh, Praeger – via archive.org
- Francke, August Hermann (1907), A History of Western Tibet, S. W. Partridge & Co – via archive.org
- Francke, August Hermann (1992) [first published 1926]. Antiquities of Indian Tibet. Asian Educational Services. p. 94. ISBN 81-206-0769-4.
- Lo Bue, Erberto; Bray, John, eds. (2014), "Introduction", Art and Architecture in Ladakh: Cross-cultural Transmissions in the Himalayas and Karakoram, BRILL, ISBN 978-90-04-27180-7
  - Howard, Neil; Howard, Kath (2014), "Historic Ruins in the Gya Valley, Eastern Ladakh, and a Consideration of Their Relationship to the History of Ladakh and Maryul", Ibid, BRILL, pp. 68–99, ISBN 9789004271807
- Petech, Luciano (1977), The Kingdom of Ladakh, c. 950–1842 A.D. (PDF), Instituto Italiano Per il Medio ed Estremo Oriente – via academia.edu
