= Era of Fragmentation =

Period of Tibetan history (9th–11th centuries CE)

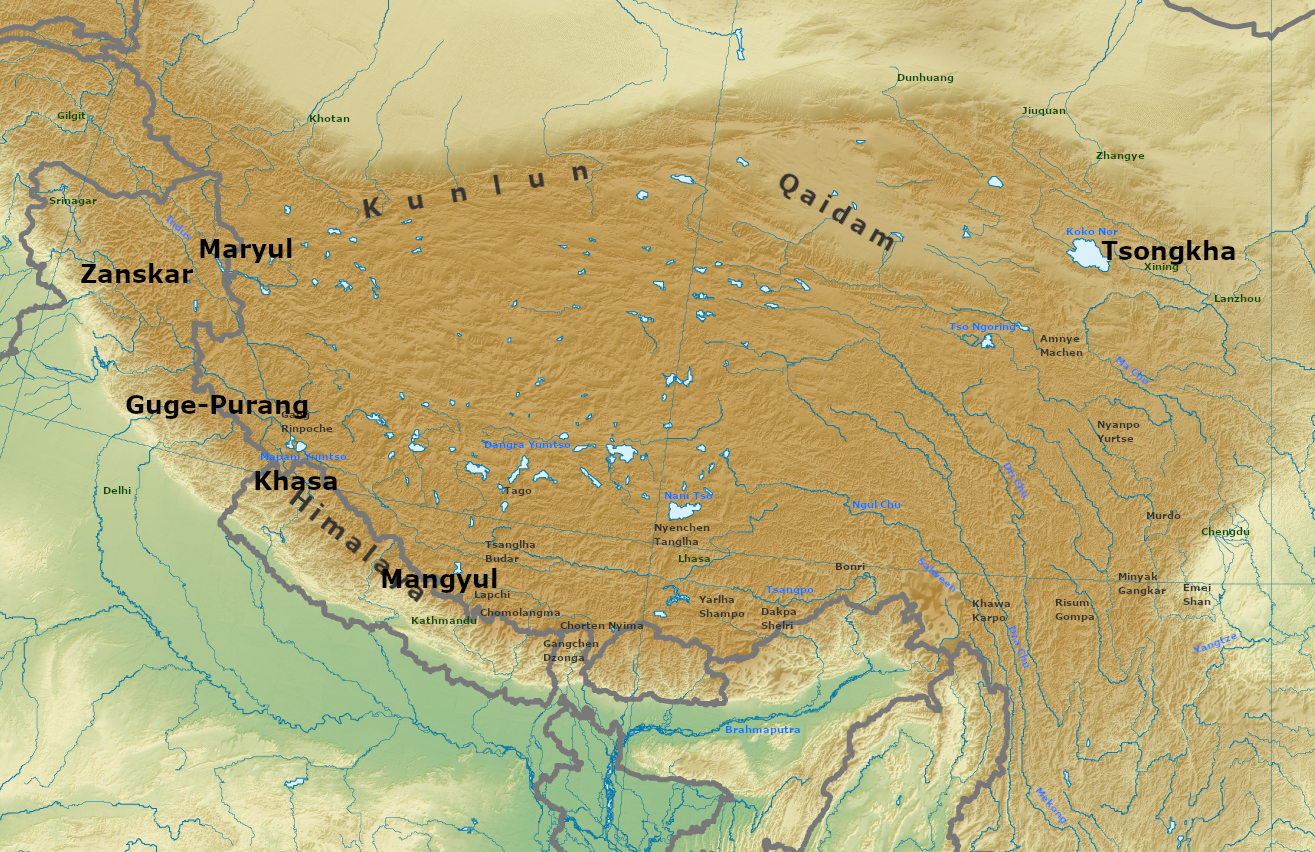
Map showing the major kingdoms of Tibet during the Era of Fragmentation: Purang-Guge, Maryul, Zanskar, Khasa, Mangyül and Tsongkha

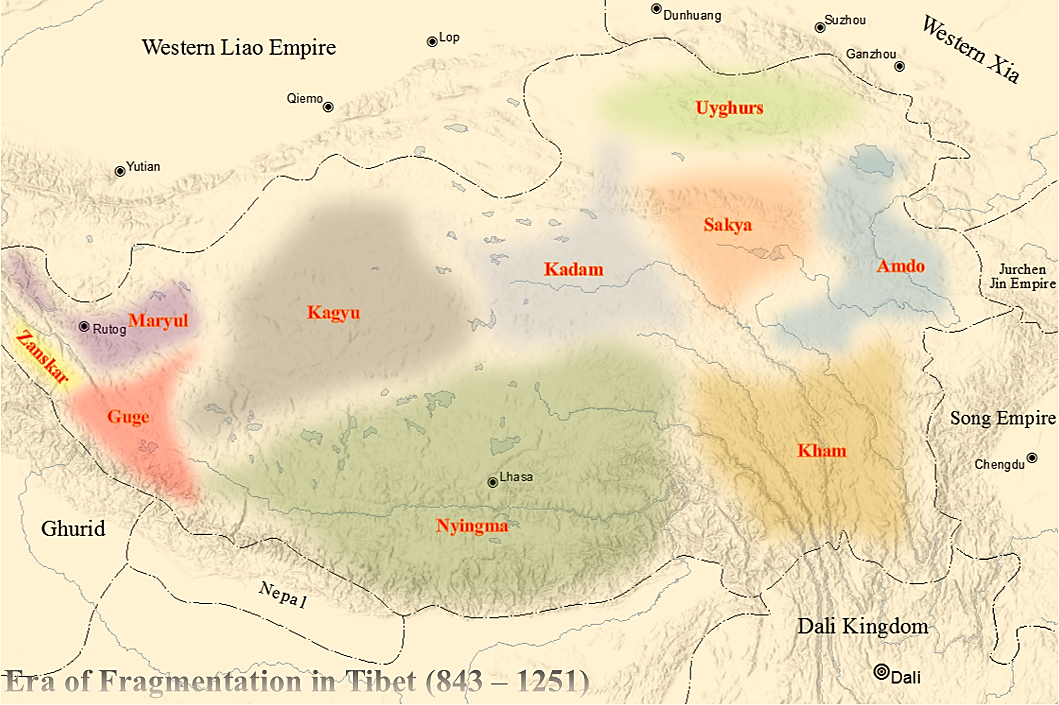
Map showing major regional affiliations during the Era of Fragmentation in Tibet

The Era of Fragmentation (Tibetan: སིལ་བའི་དུས།) was a period of disunity in Tibetan history, lasting from the assassination of the last Tsenpo of Tibetan Empire, Langdarma in 842 until Drogön Chögyal Phagpa became the Imperial Preceptor of the three regions of Tibet in 1253, following the Mongol conquest in the 1240s. During this period, the political unity of the Tibetan Empire collapsed following the Battle of U-Yor between Yumtän (Yum brtan) and Ösung (’Od-srung), after which followed numerous rebellions against the remnants of the empire and the rise of regional warlords.

== Civil war and the decline of imperial Tibet ==
The last king of the unified Tibetan Empire, Langdarma, was assassinated in 842 possibly by a Buddhist hermit monk named Pelgyi Dorje of Lhalung, or other sources state he died from fright. The death left two possible heirs, the two princes Yumtän and Ösung, that fought for the throne and initiated a civil war. This civil war weakened the political authority of the Tibetan monarchy, dissolving Tibet into separate tribes and small kingdoms.

The successors of Ösung controlled the western region of Ngari, while the successors of Yumtän controlled the central region of Ü. The son of Ösung was Pälkhortsän (Dpal 'khor brtsan) (865–895 or 893–923), who had two sons, Trashi Tsentsän (Bkra shis brtsen brtsan) and Thrikhyiding (Khri khyi lding), also called Kyide Nyigön (Skyid lde nyi ma mgon) in some sources. Thrikhyiding migrated to the western Tibetan region of upper Ngari (Stod Mnga ris) and married a woman of high central Tibetan nobility, with whom he founded a local dynasty that would go on to create the kingdoms of Purang-Guge, Maryul, and Zanskar.

== Revolts and autonomy ==
The dissolution of a centralized empire returned imperial Tibet to a multitude of separate, autonomous kingdoms, each ruled by a local leader, as were the local polities before Songtsen Gampo. The leaders constantly fought for political dominance, utilizing their private armies and military fortresses. Between 842 and 1247, no central authority was in control of Tibet and relatively smaller kingdoms like Guge, Derge, Nangchen, and Maryul (Ladakh) emerged. The period ended with the Mongol conquest of Tibet and the subsequent Yuan rule of Tibet and patronage of the Sakya school.

Traditional accounts of the period focus on religion. The Era of Fragmentation is depicted as a low point in the development of Tibetan Buddhism, with the Nyingma school's monastic orders facing persecution and internal exile. Nyingma monasteries were alleged to have only persevered in Amdo, then largely dominated by non-Tibetan peoples and conquered by a Tibetan polity in the 10th century.

In Amdo and during the brief reign of Langdarma, three Nyingma school monks fled to there, possibly to Mount Dantig. Their disciple Muzu Selbar (Wylie: mu zu gsal 'bar), later known as the scholar Gongpa Rapsel (Wylie: dgongs pa rab gsal, 953-1035), was responsible for the revival of the Nyingma school and Tibetan Buddhism in Amdo and in northeastern Tibet. The students of Rapsal returned to Ü-Tsang, where they re-propagated the Nyingma lineages and monastic Tibetan Buddhist orders.

Modern historians argue that Buddhism was in fact widespread during the fragmentation period, and that local polities shared close relationships with Buddhist monastic leaders.

== See also ==
- Ladakh Chronicles
- Song–Tibet relations
