= Tsongkha =

Tibetan Theocracy

- 997–1104
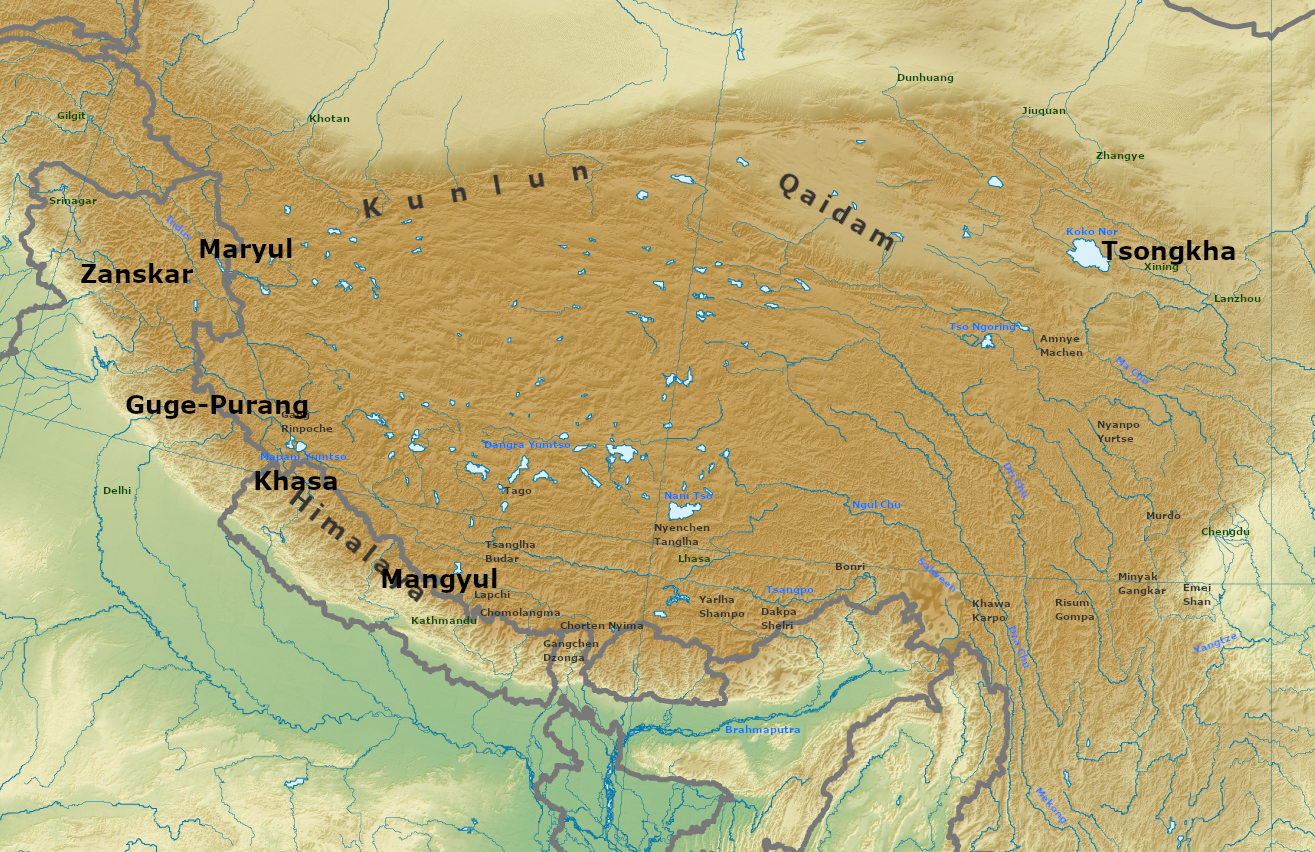
- Capital: Tsongkha (modern Ping'an District), Qingtang (Xining)
- Common languages: Tibetan
- Religion: Buddhism
- Government: Theocracy
- History
  - Established: 997
  - Disestablished: 1104
Preceded by	Succeeded by
Xiliangfu	Song dynasty
- Today part of: China

Tsongkha (Tibetan: ཙོང་ཁ།, Wylie: tsong kha; Chinese: 宗喀國), also known as Qingtang (Chinese: 青唐國) and Gusiluo (Chinese: 唃廝囉國), was a Tibetan theocracy that ruled northeastern Tibet from 997 to 1104.

== History ==
In 997 the elders of Amdo found a descendant of the Yarlung dynasty in Gaochang by the name of Qinanling Wenqianbu. They took him to Hezhou where they named him Gusiluo/Juesiluo, otherwise known as Gyelsé, meaning "son of Buddha".

In 1008 Gusiluo was enthroned at Kuozhou as Tsenpo.

In 1017 Tsongkha was defeated by the Song dynasty commander Cao Wei.

In 1025 Gusiluo relocated to Miaochuan.

In 1032 Gusiluo relocated to Qingtang. Around the same time his eldest son Xiazhan established himself in Hezhou and his second son Mozhanjiao in Tsongkha.

In 1054 Xiazhan assisted the Song army in resolving a dispute among Tibetan tribes.

In 1058 a Khitan princess married Gusiluo's son Dongzhan. Dongzhan killed Xiazhan and Mozhanjiao.

In 1065 Gusiluo died and was succeeded by his son Dongzhan. Mucheng, son of Xiazhan, declared independence in Hezhou. Mucheng sided with the Tanguts and began interfering with trade caravans entering the Song dynasty.

In 1070 the monks Jiewuchila and Kangzunxinluojie attempted to enthrone Mucheng's younger brother Donggu at Wushengjun but failed.

In 1072 the Song dynasty commander Wang Shao attacked Mucheng and gained control of Wushengjun (Xizhou) and Hezhou, though Mucheng escaped. The Song general Jing Sili was killed by the Tibetan warrior Guizhang. During the taking of Hezhou, 7,000 Tibetans were killed and 12,000 were taken prisoner. More than 20,000 tent dwellings were destroyed.

In 1074 Dongzhan and Mucheng submitted to Song governance.

After the failed Song campaign in Western Xia ended in 1085, the Song lost all influence in Tsongkha. Mucheng had been succeeded by Guizhang.

In 1086, Dongzhan died and was succeeded by his adopted son, Aligu (Khotanese mother). Aligu hid the death of Dongzhan for a year and induced his father's Khitan wife to kill two other wives to eliminate potential rivals. Then he married his daughter to the Tanguts. Aligu allied with the Western Xia minister Liang Qipu, married the Tangut princess Jinshan, and gained Song recognition, which infuriated Guizhang. Guizhang fortified himself at Taozhou and began raiding Song territory. In 1087, Song forces led by Chong Yi captured Guizhang and sent him to Kaifeng. Two years later he was released and sent to live in Qinzhou, where he died two years later.

Aligu was an unpopular ruler. In 1092 he incarcerated the tribal leader Wenxixin and his son Xibawen as Song spies.

Aligu died in 1096 and was succeeded by his son, Xiazheng (Tangut mother?).

In 1099, Xiazheng was expelled by Xinmouqinzhan, who enthroned Longza as rightful heir to the Gusiluo line. The Song commander Wang Shan defeated Longza and occupied Tsongkha. At first the Song tried to directly administrate the area, but Tibetan resistance forced the reinstatement of Longza as hereditary administrator and Mucheng's son, Bangbiwudingwa as military commissioner with responsibility over the Tibetan tribes.

Longza returned to power in 1101, but was immediately driven off by his brother, Xisheluosa (Kuchean mother?).

In 1103, the Song dispatched Wang Hou to conquer Tsongkha. Wang led 20,000 troops to capture the Tibetan border settlements, forcing Xisheluosa to retreat to Tsongkha (Zongge). Wang's forces were increased by another 10,000 reinforcements. They defeated a Tibetan army, taking 4,316 heads and over 3,000 prisoners. A princess of Tsongkha led her followers to surrender. Qingtang turned on Xisheluosa, who fled further west into Qinghai. The Song armies occupied the region again and renamed Qingtang to Xining.

== Aftermath ==
Xiazheng found refuge in Song territory and died in 1102.

In 1108, Longza, renamed Zhao Huaide, was raised to the rank of prince and military governor. Rebellious elements in the newly conquered territory persisted. The tribal chieftains, Jiezhanpangjian and Zangzhengpuge, continued to raid Song territory. Song forces eventually forced Jiezhanpangjian to flee and without his help, Zangzhengpuge submitted to Song authority.

By 1109 the Song dynasty had registered all the Tibetan towns of Kokonor under Chinese names.

The area was later conquered by the Jin dynasty (1115–1234), which ceded the area to the Western Xia in 1136.

== Bibliography ==
- Bielenstein, Hans (2005), Diplomacy and Trade in the Chinese World, 589-1276, BRILL, ISBN 9789047407614
- Dunnell, Ruth W. (1996), The Great State of White and High: Buddhism and State Formation in Eleventh-Century Xia, University of Hawai‘i Press
- Smith, Paul Jakov (2006), Irredentism as Political Capital
- Tuttle, Gray (2013), The Tibetan History Reader, Columbia University Press
- Twitchett, Denis (1994), The Cambridge History of China, Volume 6, Alien Regime and Border States, 907-1368, Cambridge: Cambridge University Press, ISBN 0521243319
