= Langdarma =

8th Tibetan Emperor and 41st King of Tibet (d.842)

Darma U Dum Tsen དར་མ་འུ་དུམ་བཙན
- Tsenpo

King of Tibet
- Reign: 841 – 842
- Predecessor: Tritsuk Detsen
- Successor: Era of Fragmentation
- Lönchen: We Gyaltore Taknye
- Born: Darma; After 790s?
- Died: 842
- Burial: Trülgyel Mausoleum, Valley of the Kings
- Spouse: Manamza; Tsépongza Tsen Mopen
- Issue: Tride Yumten; Namde Ösung
Names
- Tri Darma U Dum Tsen (དར་མ་འུ་དུམ་བཙན་)
- Dynasty: Yarlung
- Father: Tridé Songtsen
- Mother: Droza Lhagyel Mangmojé
- Religion: Bön

- Langdarma

Tibetan name
- Tibetan: གླང་དར་མ། འུ་དུམ་བཙན་པོ
Transcriptions
- Wylie: glang dar ma 'u dum btsan po
- Lhasa IPA: [laŋtaːma] / [udum tsɛ̃po]

Darma U Dum Tsen (Tibetan: དར་མ་འུ་དུམ་བཙན, Wylie: dar ma 'u dum btsan), better known as Langdarma (Tibetan: གླང་དར་མ།, Wylie: glang dar ma, THL: Lang Darma, lit. "Mature Bull" or "Darma the Bull"), was the last king (Tsenpo) of the Tibetan Empire who in 838 assassinated his brother, Tritsuk Detsen, then reigned from 841 until his own assassination in 842. His reign led to the dissolution of the Tibetan Empire, which had extended beyond the Tibetan Plateau to include the Silk Roads with the Tibetan manuscript center at Sachu (Dunhuang), and neighbouring regions in China, Afghanistan, and India. He prosecuted Buddhism during his reign and was assassinated by a Buddhist monk Lhalung Pelgyi Dorje.

== History ==
Earlier in his life as a Tibetan prince, Langdarma was Buddhist, but under the influence of Wégyel Toré (Wylie: dbas rgyal to re), he became a follower of Bon, after which he assassinated his brother King Ralpachen, in 838. Following this, he widely persecuted Tibetan monks, nuns, and destroyed their monasteries which were those of the Nyingma school, the only school of Tibetan Buddhism at that time.

Langdarma only reigned for a year to a year and a half, before his own death. Another source says the reign was either six or thirteen years. A Buddhist hermit or monk named Lhalung Pelgyi Dorje is often credited with assassinating Langdarma in 842, or in 846, but other sources credit Nyingma master Nubchen Sangye Yeshe with frightening him to death after Langdarma threatened the practitioners in Nubchen Sangye Yeshe's monastic institute. His death was followed by civil war and the dissolution of the Tibetan Empire, leading to the Era of Fragmentation.

== Family ==
Langdarma had at least two children: sons Tride Yumten by his first wife, and Namde Ösung by his second wife. They apparently competed for power, the former ruling over the central kingdom of Ü, and the other ruling over the "left wing", probably the eastern territories.

One of Langdarma's grandsons, Kyidé Nyima Gön (Wylie: skyid lde nyi ma gon), conquered Ngari in the late 10th century, although his army originally numbered only 300 men. Kyidé Nyima Gön founded several towns and castles and he apparently ordered the construction of the main sculptures at Shey. "In an inscription he says he had them made for the religious benefit of the Tsenpo (the dynastic title of his father and ancestors), and of all the people of Ngaris (Western Tibet). This shows that already in this generation Langdarma's opposition to Buddhism had disappeared." Shey, just 15 km east of modern Leh, was the ancient seat of the Ladakhi kings.

Following his persecution of Tibetan Buddhism, Atiśa was called from Sumatra to restore Buddhism to Tibet.

The anti-Buddhist portrayal of this king is well documented in primary and secondary Tibetan sources, but reinterpretations have been published from two historians, most prominently Zuiho Yamaguchi.

In Tibetan Buddhist culture, Darma U Dum Tsen was said to be the incarnation of Gośīrṣa, the Ox-Head and Horse-Face guardian of hell, thus he got the nickname, Langdarma, literally, "Darma, the bull".

Langdarma was said to have had "a black tongue", and a common gesture of Tibetans briefly sticking out their tongues is interpreted to show agreement, and as a sign of respect. When they demonstrate that they do not have black tongues, they show they are not guilty of evil deeds, and that they are not incarnations of the malevolent king.

== See also ==
- Huichang persecution of Buddhism, an anti-Buddhist movement in Tang China in the same period

== Notes ==
Regnal titles
Preceded by Ralpacan	Emperor of Tibet r. 838–841	Succeeded by 'Od-srung (Guge) and Yum-brtan (Lhasa)
