= Pargor Subdistrict =

Neighborhood in Lhasa, Tibet

Coordinates: 29°39′1.17″N 91°7′59.31″E

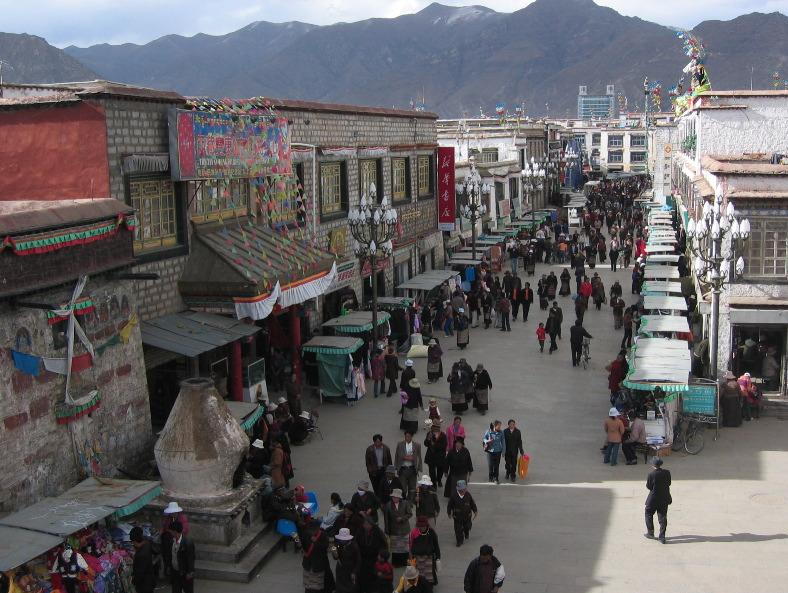
An aerial view of the Barkhor

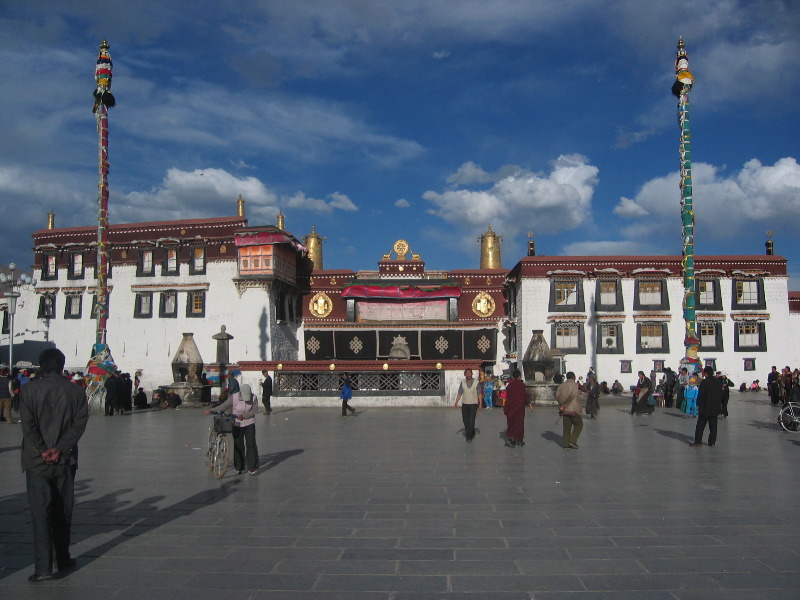
Barkhor Square and Jokhang Temple

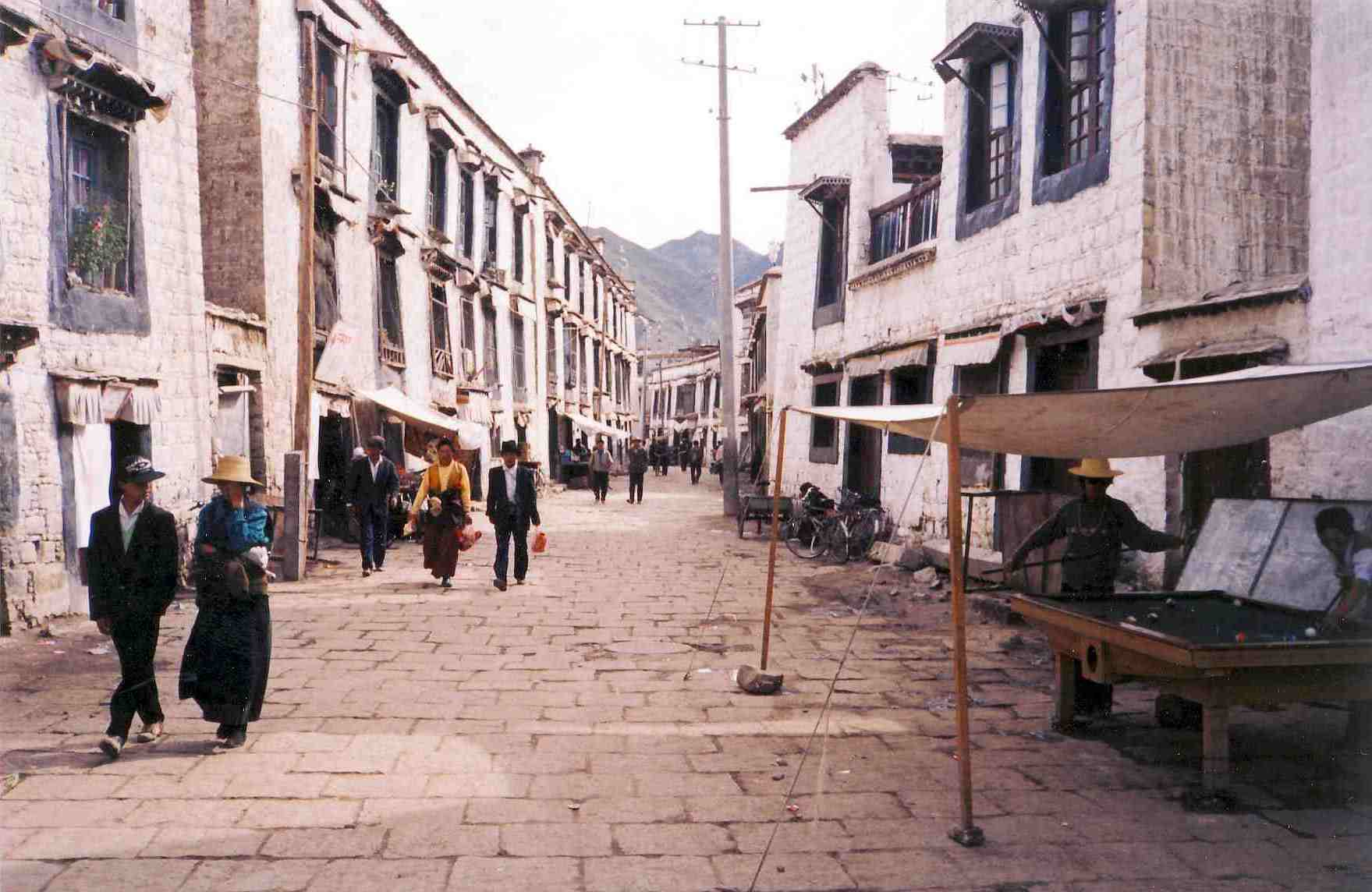
Old Barkhor street (1993)

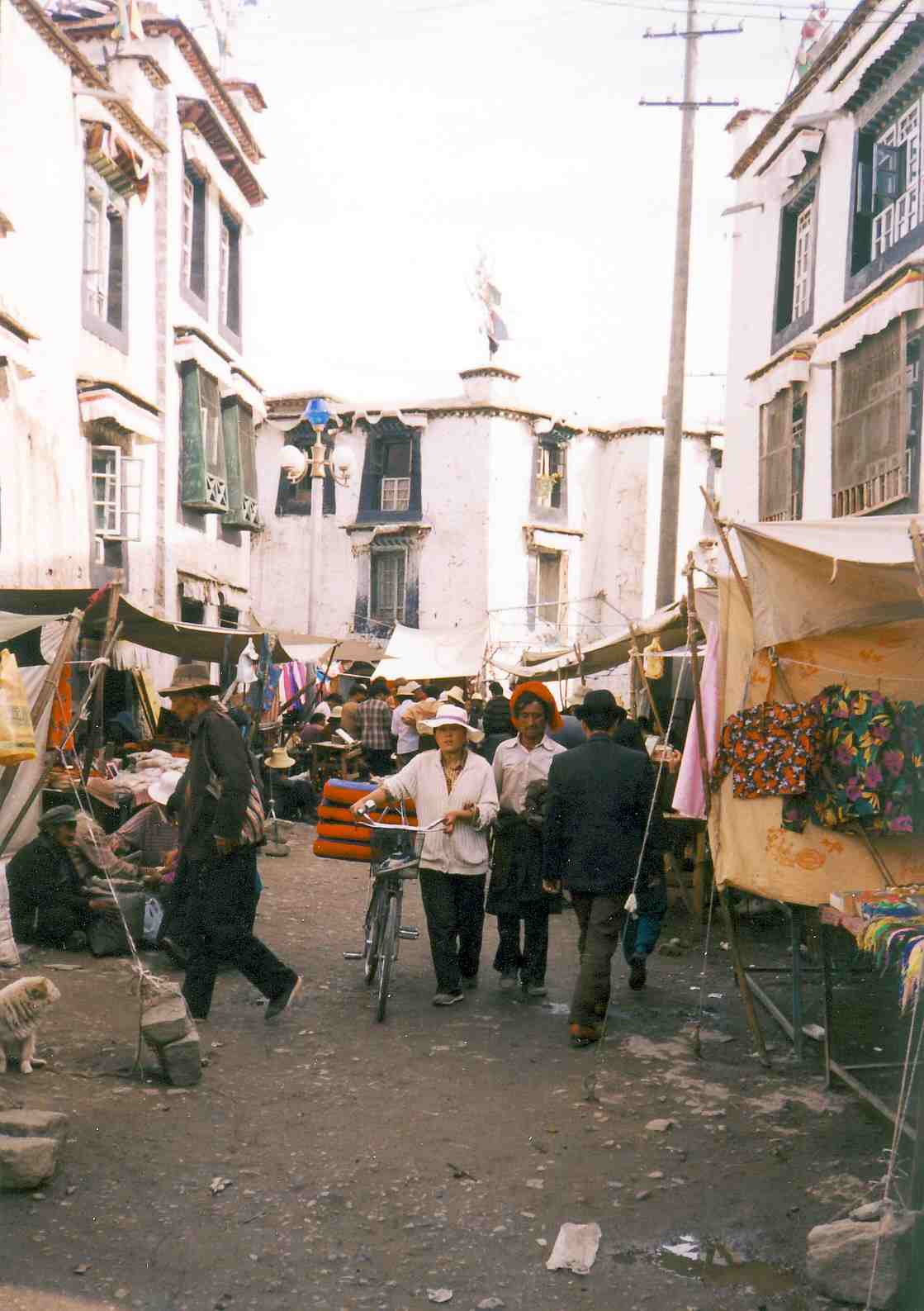
Barkhor street scene, Lhasa (1993)

The Barkhor Square, or Barkhor (known also as Pargor Subdistrict, Tibetan: བར་སྐོར་, Wylie: bar-skor, ZWPY: Pargor; Chinese: 八廓; pinyin: bākuò), is an historic area of narrow streets and a public square with markets, and the circumambulation route around the Jokhang Temple in Lhasa, Tibet, China.

The Barkhor is a popular devotional circumambulation around the historic Jokhang for pilgrims and locals. The walk is about a kilometre long and encircles the entire Jokhang Temple complex, the former seat of the Nechung Oracle in Lhasa called the Muru Nyingba Monastery, and a number of former nobles' houses including Tromzikhang and Jamkhang. There are four large incense burners (sangkangs) in the four cardinal directions, with incense burning constantly, to please the gods protecting the Jokhang. The Tromzikhang market is busy in the Barkhor, and the area is a major tourist attraction.

Because the Jokhang Temple has also become a symbolic centre of Tibetan protests since 1987, the Barkhor has also seen many demonstrations. When the 14th Dalai Lama won the Nobel Peace Prize in 1989, many of his supporters threw tsampa around the Barkhor to celebrate. After the central government denounced the prize, residents who continued such demonstrations were arrested. The square was briefly closed by riot police during the 2008 Lhasa protests.
