= Lhasa Teachers College =

College in Lhasa, Tibet, China

Coordinates: 29.65442°N 91.25618°E

Lhasa Teachers College (Chinese: 拉萨师范高等专科学校), also known as Lhasa Normal College, is a teacher training institution in Lhasa, Tibet Autonomous Region (TAR) of the People's Republic of China, located at No. 43, Nyange Road, Lhasa.

== History ==
The college traces its origin to the "Teacher Training Course" initiated by the Lhasa Culture and Education Bureau. In August 1975, with the approval of the People's Government of the Tibet Autonomous Region, Lhasa Teachers' Training School (Chinese: 拉萨市师范学校) was established, which was moved to its present location at No. 43, Nyange Road, in 1978.

On February 14, 2006, with the approval of the National Colleges and Universities Establishment Review Committee (Chinese: 全国高校设置评议委员会), the school was upgraded to a teacher training college and renamed Lhasa Teachers College.
