= The Lhasa Atlas =

2001 book by Knud Larsen and Amund Sinding-Larsen

The Lhasa Atlas: Traditional Tibetan Architecture and Townscape
- Author: Knud Larsen; Amund Sinding-Larsen
- Language: English
- Subject: Architecture; History; Geography
- Genre: non-fiction
- Published: 2001
- Publisher: Serindia Publications
- Publication place: United States
- Media type: Hardcover
- Pages: 180
- ISBN: 978-0-906-026571

The Lhasa Atlas: Traditional Tibetan Architecture and Townscape is a non-fiction book on Lhasa's architecture and town planning by Knud Larsen and Amund Sinding-Larsen.

== Background ==
The book is a collection of a large number of photographs from the recent past as well as from as far back as the 1930s, along with reproductions of paintings, reproductions of line drawings, satellite photographs, and old and new maps. Also, the text goes into detail about a number of buildings in Lhasa based on the basics and details of Tibetan architecture, as well as the efforts that have been made to keep these buildings around.

== Content ==
The contents of this book are presented in the following chapters: architecture, townscape, buildings, and the preservation of Lhasa and its future. The topic of Tibetan architecture is covered in the first chapter. The architecture of Lhasa is the subject of the second chapter. The third chapter focuses on significant historical buildings in Lhasa that were constructed before 1950. The final chapter discusses the preservation of Lhasa as well as its potential in the future.

== Reception ==
Writing for The Tibet Journal, Dhondup Tsering writes, "As I am writing this review, further demolitions of traditional building complex near the Jokhang Temple are reported. In this light, The Lhasa Atlas becomes all the more important since it now includes a record of something that no longer exist."

In Journal of Peace Research, Åshild Kolås writes, "In the midst of a wave of demolition, the project team painstakingly documented many of the old buildings of Lhasa in an effort to safeguard its traditional architecture. Although the Chinese authorities were spending millions on renovating the Potala Palace and Jokhang Temple, the Old Town surrounding the Jokhang was evidently not considered worthy of protection."

In a review for Arts Asiatiques, late French Tibetologist Anne Chayet writes, "The work presents a certain number of occasional inaccuracies and its historical references are insufficient, or else insufficiently explicit, although the authors were right to underline the difference in conception, for such a study, between the architect, the art historian, and the curator."
