= Muru Nyingba Monastery =

Buddhist monastery in Tibet, China

- Tibetan transcription(s); Wylie transliteration: rMe ru snying pa
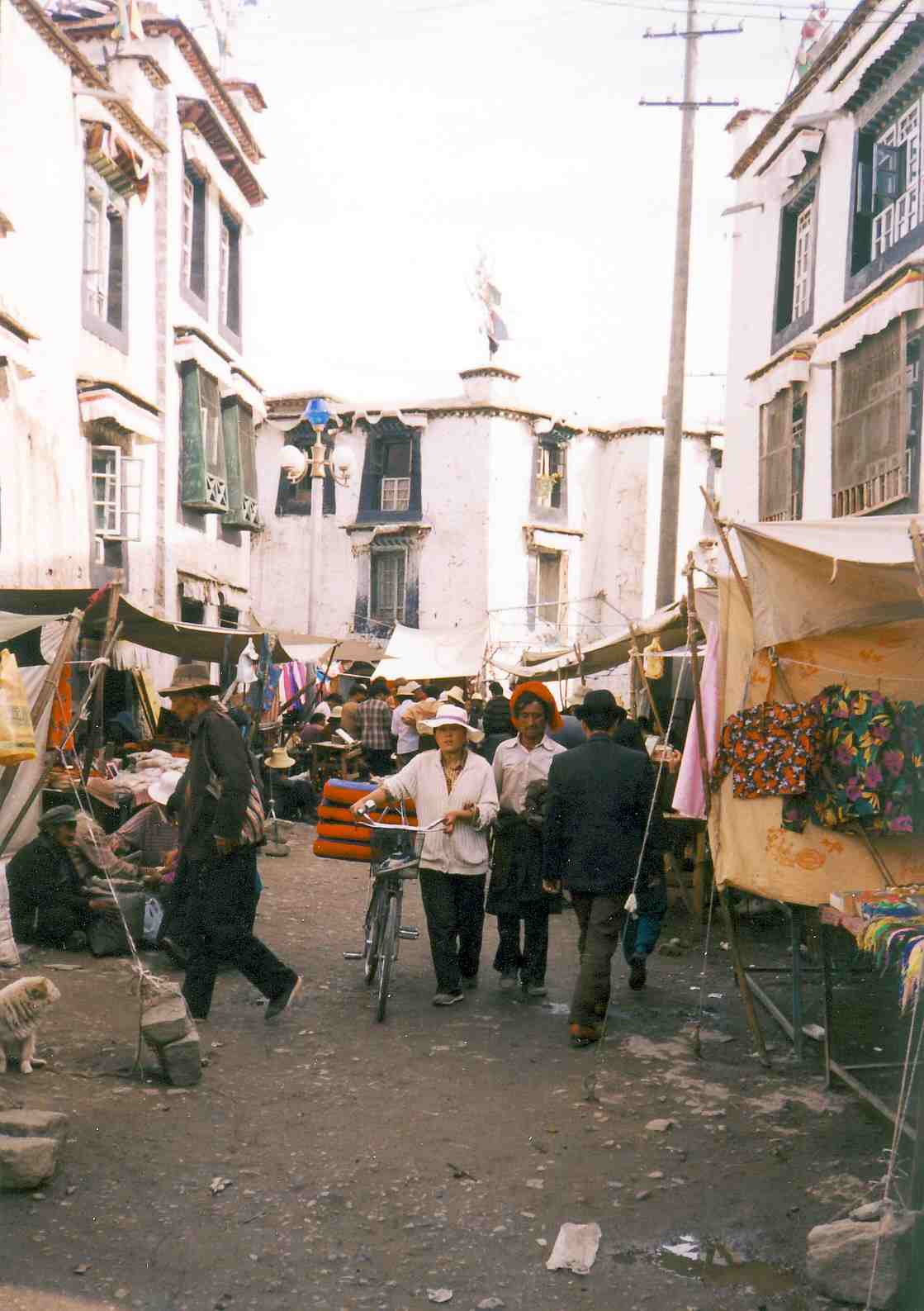
- Nearby Barkhor street scene, 1993

- Location within Tibet Autonomous Region

Religion
- Affiliation: Tibetan Buddhism

Location
- Location: Barkhor, Lhasa, Tibet Autonomous Region, China
- Country: China
- Coordinates: 29°39′10″N 91°7′58″E

Architecture
- Founder: Songtsen Gampo
- Established: 7th century

Muru Ningba or Meru Nyingba (rMe ru snying pa) (Tibetan: རྨེ་རུ་སྙིང་པ་) is a small Buddhist monastery located between the larger monasteries of Jokhang and Barkhor in the city of Lhasa, Tibet, China. It was the Lhasa seat of the former State Oracle who had his main residence at Nechung Monastery.

It is located immediately behind and east of the Jokhang and may be accessed from the north side of the Barkhor.

== History ==
It is said that Emperor Songtsen Gampo built the first building here and it is where the great Tibetan scholar, Thonmi Sambhota, completed his work developing the Tibetan alphabet in the first half of the 7th century.

The present building, first constructed during the reign of King Ralpachen (c. 806-838 CE), is built like an Indian vihara around a courtyard, with the lhakang ('temple', literally 'residence of the deity') to the north and monks quarters on the three other sides. At that time, the Nyingma school was the sole Tibetan Buddhist school.

The building was destroyed during the persecution of Buddhism under Langdarma (c. 838 to 841 CE), but it was rebuilt by Atisha (980-1054 CE). In the 16th century, the monastery was incorporated into the Gelug school under Sonam Gyatso, the 3rd Dalai Lama (1543–1589).

It became the Lhasa residence of the Nechung Oracle in the 17th century, who was possessed by Pehar in his trances.

== Description ==
The lhakang contains a number of fine murals — the central image being that of Guru Rinpoche (Padmasambhava), with images of the five Nyingma Yidam-Protectors and Tseumar and Tamdrin in glass cases around the walls.

On the western side of the gallery upstairs is the Gongkar Chode Branch Temple, a Sakya shrine dedicated to an image of Gonpo Pelgon Dramtso or Bramze, the Sadhu-Protector of the monastery. His image is to the right of the door and used to be flanked by images of the six-armed Mahakala, Panjara and Shridevi.

The oldest extant structure is the Jambhala Lhakhang which was originally built under Ralpacan. It is quite small (7.5 x 7.2 metres), with a low ceiling. It is said to have been where Thonmi Sambhota worked on the alphabet and later became attached to Nechung.

The Dhukang or Assembly Hall, a very active temple, was built in the 19th century by Nechung Khenpo Sakya Ngape, and renovated in 1986. There are frescoes portraying the protector deity Dorje Drakden, Tsongkhapa, Atisha, Padmasambhava, Shantarakshita, and King Trisong Detsen. The central image of Avalokiteshvara is new with a copper Padmasambhava to the right and a sand mandala to the left. Behind is an inner sanctum with more images and upstairs is the Tsepame Lhakang with 1,000 small images of Amitayas (or Amitābha) Buddha.
