= Lhasa =

Urban district of the City of Lhasa in Tibet

Lhasa 城关区 ཁྲིན་ཀོན་ཆུས། Chengguan, Chênggoin, Chengguān
- District
- District of Chengguan of the City of Lhasa
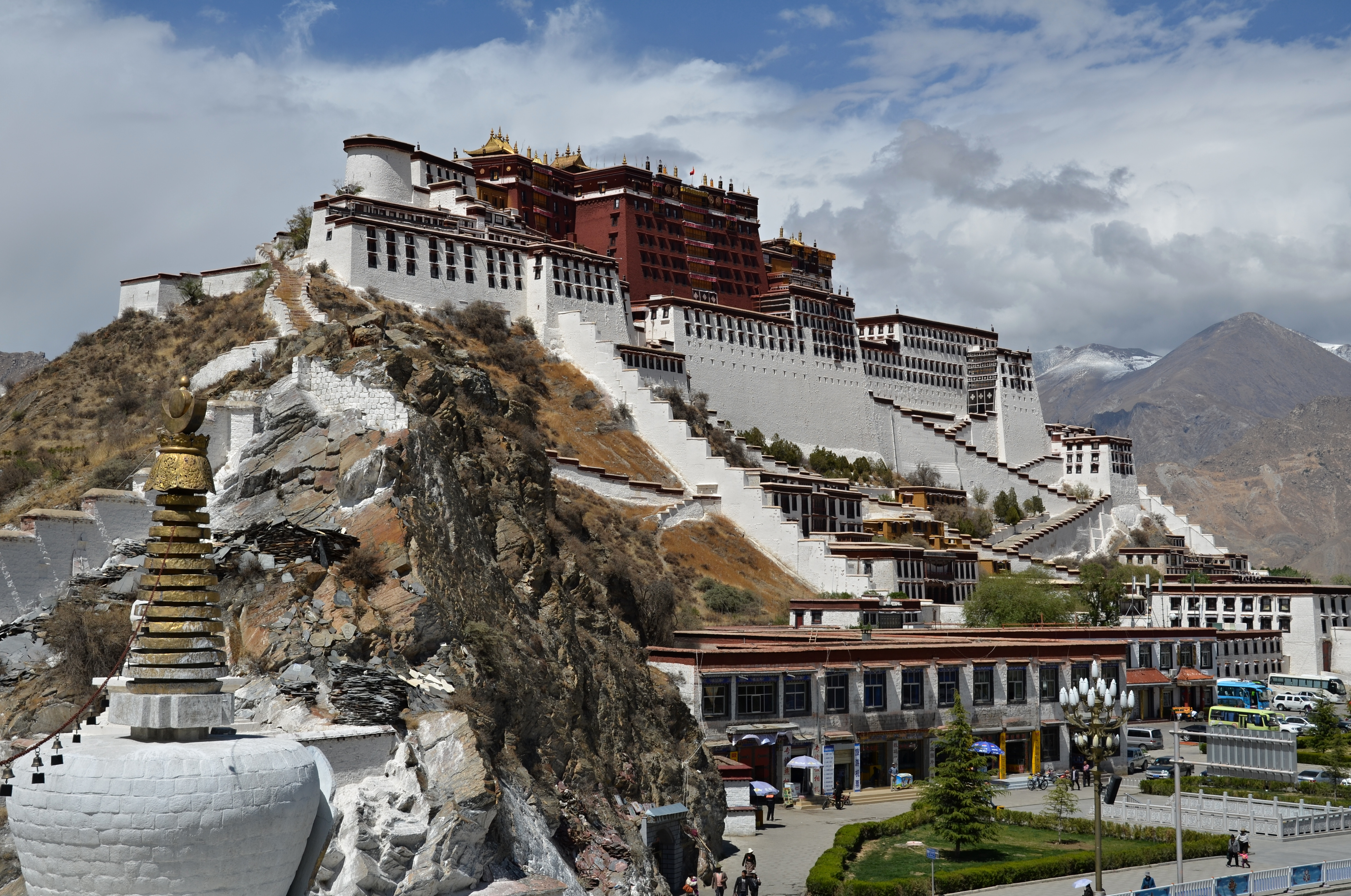
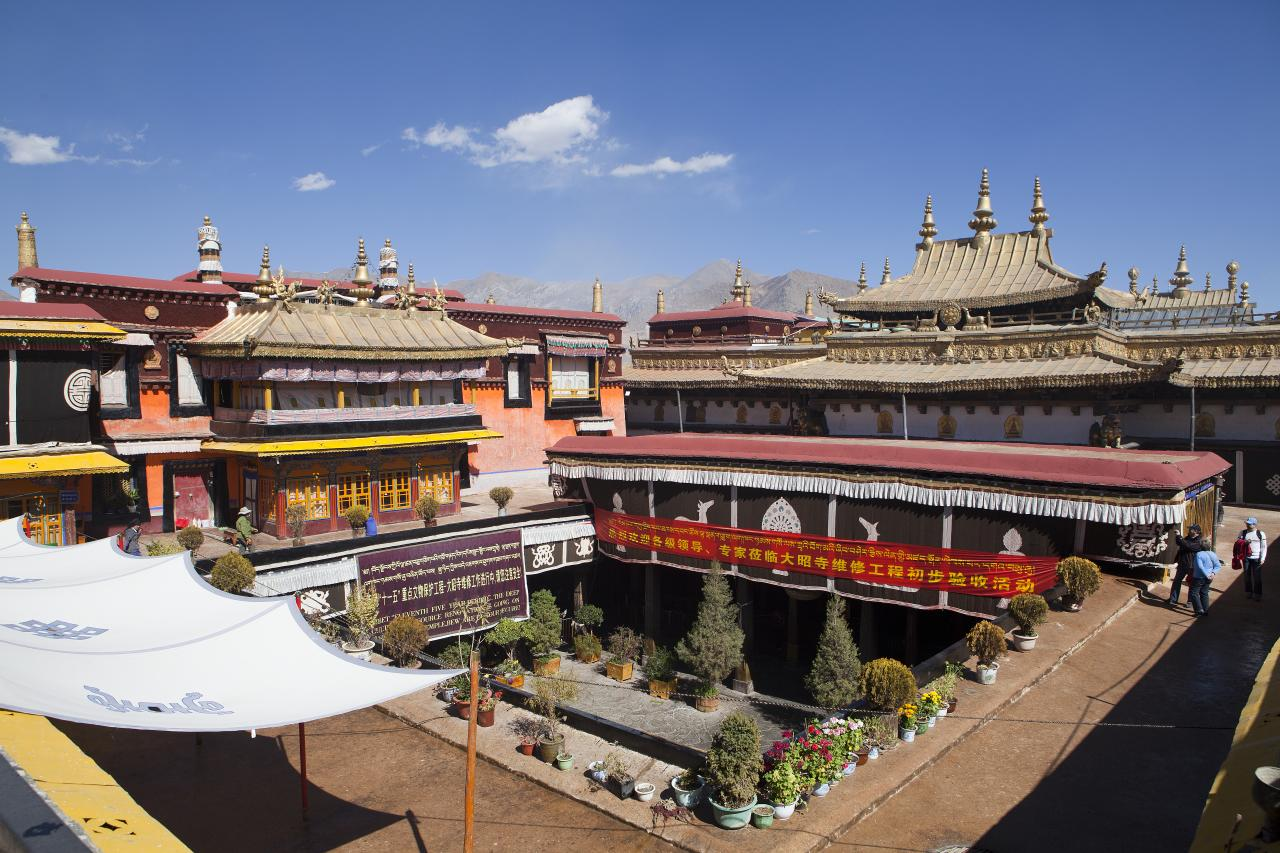
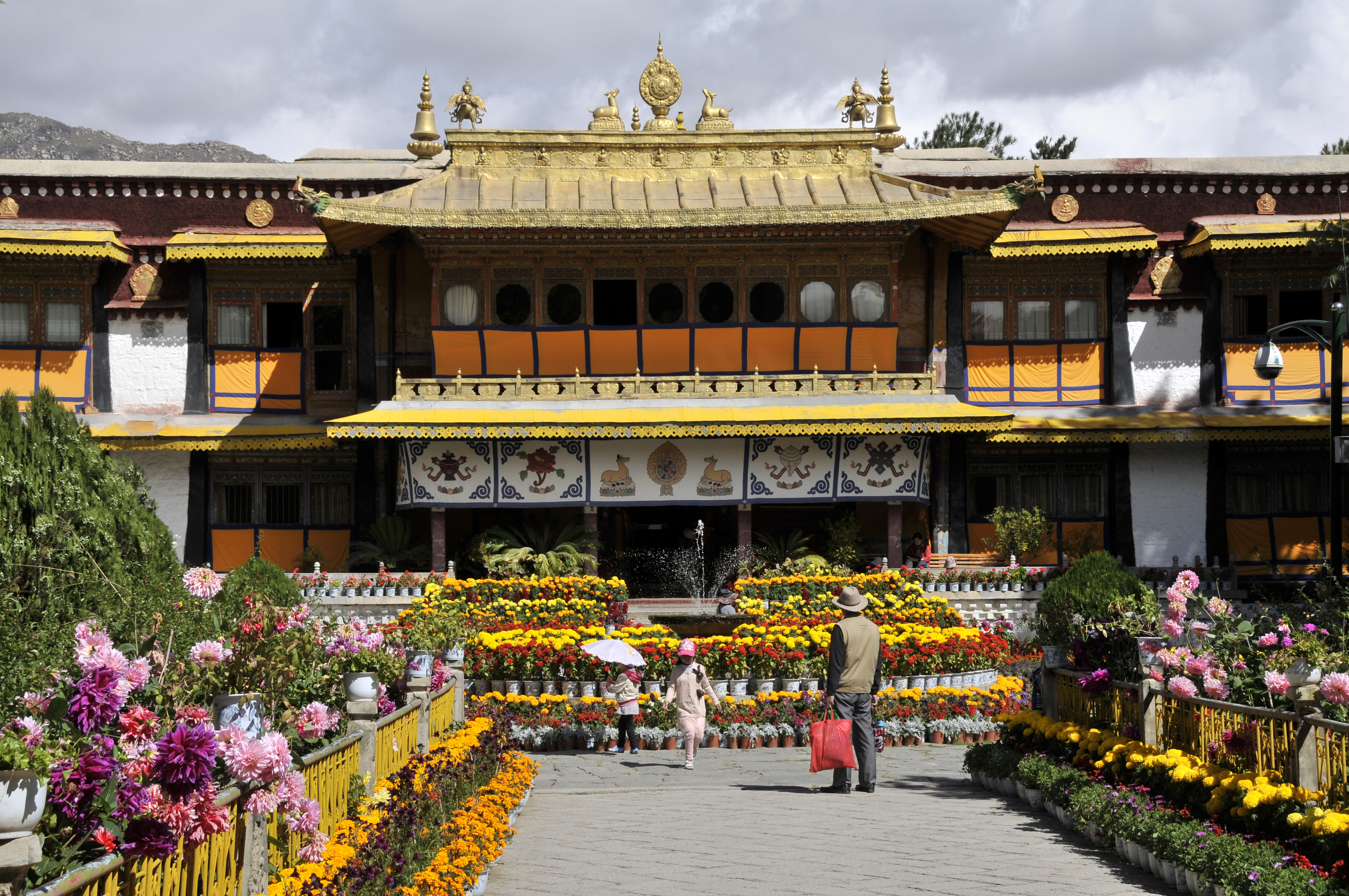
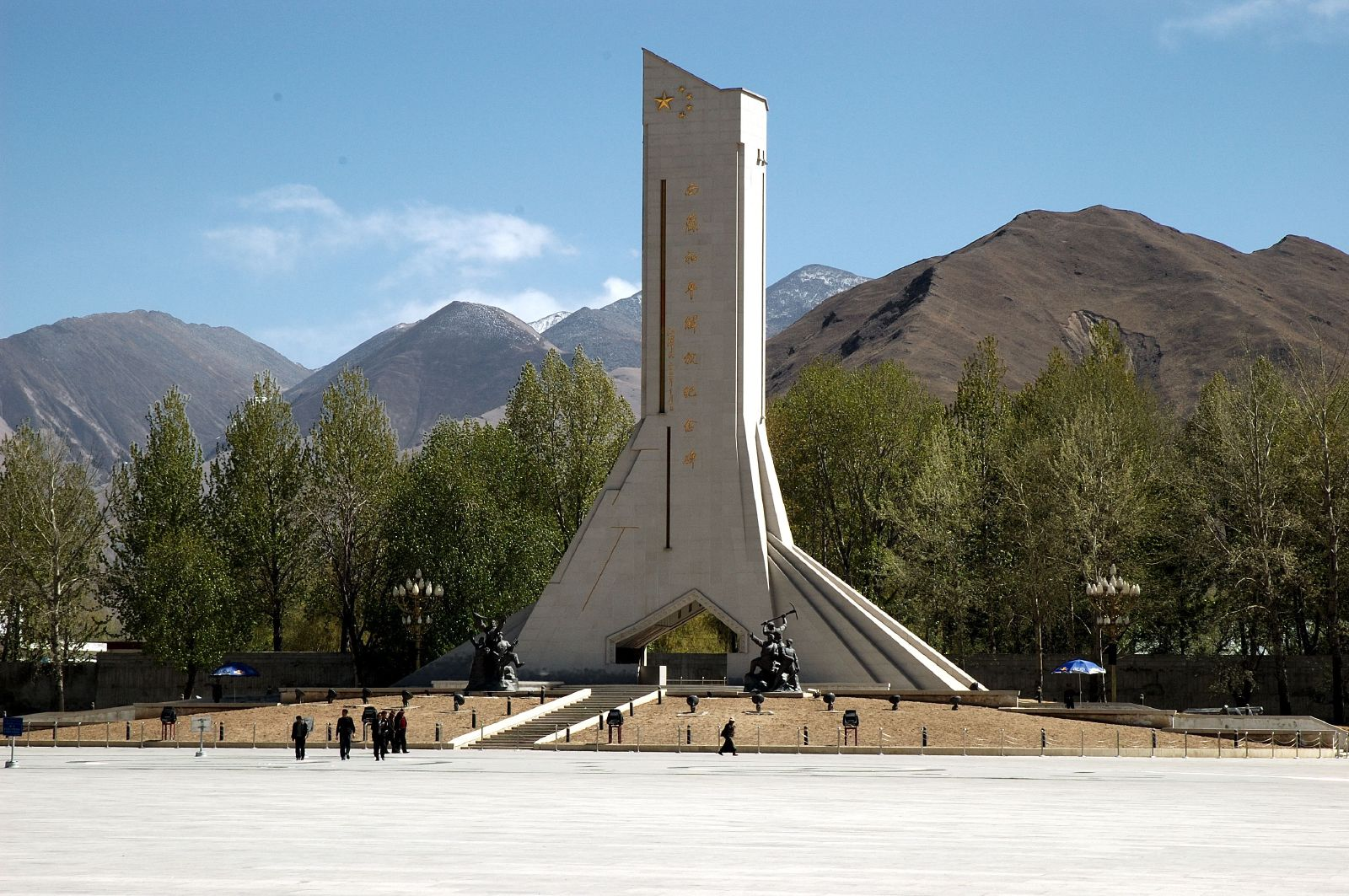
- Potala Palace Jokhang Temple Norbulingka Palace Drepung Monastery Liberation Monument Barkhor Square
- Interactive map of Lhasa
- Location in Tibet Lhasa (China)
- Coordinates (Tibet government): 29°39′14″N 91°07′03″E
- Country: China
- Autonomous region: Tibet
- Prefecture-level city: Lhasa
- District seat: Gyirai Subdistrict

Area
  - District: 525 km^{2} (203 sq mi)
  - Urban: 168 km^{2} (65 sq mi)
- Elevation: 3,656 m (11,995 ft)

Population (2020)
  - District: 464,736
  - Density: 885/km^{2} (2,290/sq mi)
  - Urban (2020): 464,736
  - Major Ethnic groups: Tibetan; Han; Hui; Nepali
  - Languages: Tibetan; Mandarin
- Time zone: UTC+8 (China Standard)
- Postal code: 850000
- Area code: 891
- Website: www.cgq.gov.cn (in Chinese)

Lhasa

Chinese name
- Simplified Chinese: 拉萨
- Traditional Chinese: 拉薩
- Literal meaning: (in Tibetan) "Place of the Gods"
Transcriptions
Standard Mandarin
- Hanyu Pinyin: Lāsà
- Bopomofo: ㄌㄚ ㄙㄚˋ
- Gwoyeu Romatzyh: Lhasah
- Wade–Giles: La^{1}-sa^{4}
- Yale Romanization: Lāsà
- IPA: [lá.sâ]

Historical Chinese name
- Simplified Chinese: 逻些
- Traditional Chinese: 邏些
Transcriptions
Standard Mandarin
- Hanyu Pinyin: Luóxiē
- Bopomofo: ㄌㄨㄛˊ ㄒㄧㄝ
- Gwoyeu Romatzyh: Luoshie
- Wade–Giles: Lo^{2}-hsieh^{1}
- Yale Romanization: Lwósyē
- IPA: [lwǒ.ɕjé]

Tibetan name
- Tibetan: ལྷ་ས་
Transcriptions
- Wylie: lha sa
- THL: Lhasa
- Tibetan Pinyin: Lhasa
- Lhasa IPA: [l̥ásə] or [l̥ɜ́ːsə]

Chengguan District

Chinese name
- Simplified Chinese: 城关区
- Traditional Chinese: 城關區
Transcriptions
Standard Mandarin
- Hanyu Pinyin: Chéngguān Qū
- Bopomofo: ㄔㄥˊ ㄍㄨㄢ ㄑㄩ
- Gwoyeu Romatzyh: Cherngguan Chiu
- Wade–Giles: Chʻêng^{2}-kuan^{1} Chʻü^{1}
- Yale Romanization: Chénggwān Chyū
- IPA: [ʈʂʰə̌ŋ.kwán tɕʰý]

Tibetan name
- Tibetan: ཁྲིན་ཀོན་ཆུས།
Transcriptions
- Wylie: khrin kon chus
- Tibetan Pinyin: Chingoin Qü

Lhasa, (Note: /ˈlɑːsə/; Standard Tibetan: ལྷ་ས [l̥ɛː˥˥.sa˥˥], lit. 'Place of Gods') officially the Chengguan District of Lhasa City, (Note: Chinese: 拉萨市 城关区) is the inner urban district of Lhasa City, Tibet Autonomous Region, Southwestern China.

Lhasa is the second most populous urban area on the Tibetan Plateau after Xining and, at an altitude of 3,656 metres (11,990 ft), is one of the highest cities in the world. The city has been the religious and administrative capital of Tibet since the mid-17th century. It contains many culturally significant Tibetan Buddhist sites such as the Potala Palace, Jokhang Temple and Norbulingka Palaces. According to the census, the total resident population of the city by the end of 2024 will be 876,400.

== Toponymy ==
Lhasa literally translates to "place of gods" (ལྷ lha, god; ས sa, place) in the Tibetan language. Chengguan literally translates to "urban gateway" (Chinese: 城关; pinyin: Chéngguān) in the Chinese language. Ancient Tibetan documents and inscriptions demonstrate that the place was called Rasa (ར་ས), which meant "goat's place", as it was a herding site. The name was changed to Lhasa, which means "place of gods", upon its establishment as the capital of Tibet, and construction of the Jokhang temple was completed, which housed a holy statue of the Buddha. Lhasa is first recorded as the name, referring to the area's temple of Jowo, in a treaty drawn up between China and Tibet in 822 C.E. In some old European maps, where Tibet is depicted, a town named Barantola can be found; this has been suggested to be Lhasa, though also thought to possibly refer to modern Bulantai/Boluntay in the western part of the Qinghai province.

== History ==
By the mid-7th century, Songtsen Gampo had founded the Tibetan Empire, initially rising to power in the Yarlung Tsangpo River (whose lower reaches in India is known as the Brahmaputra River) Valley. After conquering the kingdom of Zhangzhung in the west, he moved the capital from the Chingwa Taktsé Castle in Chongye County (pinyin: Qióngjié Xiàn), southwest of Yarlung, to Rasa (Lhasa) where in 637 he raised the first structures on the site of what is now the Potala Palace on Mount Marpori.

In CE 639 and 641, Songtsen Gampo, who had conquered the whole Tibetan region, is said to have contracted two alliance marriages, first to Princess Bhrikuti of Nepal, and then, two years later, to Princess Wencheng of the Imperial Tang court. Bhrikuti is said to have converted him to Buddhism, which was also the faith attributed to his second wife Wencheng. In 641 he constructed the Jokhang (or Rasa Trülnang Tsulagkhang) and Ramoche Temples in Lhasa in order to house two Buddha statues, the Akshobhya Vajra (depicting the Buddha at the age of eight) and the Jowo Sakyamuni (depicting Buddha at the age of twelve), respectively brought to his court by the princesses.

A Tibetan tradition mentions that after Songtsen Gampo's death in 649 C.E., Chinese troops invaded and captured Lhasa and burnt the Red Palace. Chinese and Tibetan scholars have noted that the event is mentioned neither in the Chinese annals nor in the Tibetan manuscripts of Dunhuang. Lǐ suggested that this tradition may derive from an interpolation. Tsepon W. D. Shakabpa believes that "those histories reporting the arrival of Chinese troops are not correct." The brutality of the Chinese forces during this time is also acknowledged in later Tibetan accounts, which describe harsh actions taken against the local population and the destruction of sacred sites.

Lhasa suffered extensive damage under the reign of Langdarma in the 9th century, when the sacred sites were destroyed and desecrated, and the empire fragmented. From the fall of the monarchy in the 9th century to the accession of the 5th Dalai Lama, the centre of political power in the Tibetan region was not situated in Lhasa. However, the importance of Lhasa as a religious site became increasingly significant as the centuries progressed. It was known as the centre of Tibet where Padmasambhava magically pinned down the earth demoness and built the foundation of the Jokhang Temple over her heart. Islam has been present since the 11th century in what is considered to have always been a monolithically Buddhist culture. Two Tibetan Muslim communities have lived in Lhasa with distinct homes, food and clothing, language, education, trade and traditional herbal medicine.

By the 15th century, the city of Lhasa had risen to prominence following the founding of three large Gelugpa monasteries by Je Tsongkhapa and his disciples. The three monasteries are Ganden, Sera and Drepung which were built as part of the puritanical Buddhist revival in Tibet. The scholarly achievements and political know-how of this Gelugpa Lineage eventually pushed Lhasa once more to centre stage.

The 5th Dalai Lama, Lobsang Gyatso (1617–1682), unified Tibet and moved the centre of his administration to Lhasa in 1642 with the help of Güshi Khan of the Khoshut. With Güshi Khan as a largely uninvolved overlord, the 5th Dalai Lama and his intimates established a civil administration which is referred to by historians as the Lhasa state. The core leadership of this government is also referred to as the Ganden Phodrang, and Lhasa thereafter became both the religious and political capital. In 1645, the reconstruction of the Potala Palace began on Red Hill. In 1648, the Potrang Karpo (White Palace) of the Potala was completed, and the Potala was used as a winter palace by the Dalai Lama from that time onwards. The Potrang Marpo (Red Palace) was added between 1690 and 1694. The name Potala is derived from Mount Potalaka, the mythical abode of the Dalai Lama's divine prototype, the Bodhisattva Avalokiteśvara. The Jokhang Temple was also greatly expanded around this time. Although some wooden carvings and lintels of the Jokhang Temple date to the 7th century, the oldest of Lhasa's extant buildings, such as within the Potala Palace, the Jokhang and some of the monasteries and properties in the Old Quarter date to this second flowering in Lhasa's history.

By the end of the 17th century, Lhasa's Barkhor area formed a bustling market for foreign goods. The Jesuit missionary, Ippolito Desideri reported in 1716 that the city had a cosmopolitan community of Mongol, Chinese, Muscovite, Armenian, Kashmiri, Nepalese and Northern Indian traders. Tibet was exporting musk, gold, medicinal plants, furs and yak tails to far-flung markets, in exchange for sugar, tea, saffron, Persian turquoise, European amber and Mediterranean coral. The armies of Qing dynasty entered Lhasa in 1720, and the Qing government sent resident commissioners, called the Ambans, to the city. On 11 November 1750, the murder of the regent by the Ambans triggered a riot in the city that left more than a hundred people killed, including the Ambans. After suppressing the rebels, Qing Qianlong Emperor reorganized the Tibetan government and set up the governing council called Kashag in Lhasa in 1751.

In January 1904, a British expedition captured and briefly occupied Lhasa. The expedition's leader, Sir Francis Younghusband, negotiated the Convention of Lhasa with remaining Tibetan officials after the 13th Dalai Lama had fled to the countryside. The treaty was subsequently repudiated and was succeeded by Convention Between Great Britain and China Respecting Tibet in 1906. All remaining Chinese troops left Lhasa after the Xinhai Lhasa turmoil in 1912.

On 2 November 1949, the local Tibetan government sent a letter to Mao Zedong (then Chairman of the Chinese Communist Party) expressing its desire for talks. Tsepon Shargyalpa and Tsejang Khenpo Tubten Gyalpo were sent as representatives, but no consensus was reached. On 7 October 1950, the Chinese People's Liberation Army launched the Battle of Chamdo. After the battle, the PLA ceased military operations, released all Tibetan prisoners, and expressed its hope for a settlement through peace talks. At the invitation of the Central Government, the Dalai Lama and a Tibetan government delegation traveled to Beijing for peace talks, and in April 1951, a five-member delegation headed by Ngapo-Ngawang Jigme traveled to Beijing and reached a consensus on peace talks.

In 1959, following a failed uprising, the 14th Dalai Lama and his associates fled Tibet. Lhasa remained the political, economic, cultural and religious center of Tibet. In January 1960, Lhasa City was established. In 1964, the autonomous region and Lhasa city leaders jointly formed the Lhasa City Municipal Construction Command, led from the country's brother provinces and cities to mobilize the construction team, has built the Lhasa City YuTuo Road, KangAng East Road, NiangJe South Road, JinZhu East Road, DuoSen South Road and Beijing West Road. Lhasa local officials paved more than 100,000 square meters of asphalt. The new city center of Lhasa is three times larger than the old city center, and the population of the city has increased by more than 20,000 people. In September 1965, the Tibet Autonomous Region was established, and Lhasa became the capital of the region.

Of the 22 parks (lingkas) which surrounded the city of Lhasa, most of them over half a mile in length, where the people of Lhasa were accustomed to picnic, only three survive today: the Norbulingka, Dalai Lama's Summer Palace, constructed by the 7th Dalai Lama; a small part of the Shugtri Lingka, and the Lukhang. Dormitory blocks, offices and army barracks are built over the rest.

The Guāndì miào (關帝廟) or Gesar Lhakhang temple was erected by the Amban in 1792 atop Mount Bamare 3 kilometres (2 miles) south of the Potala to celebrate the defeat of an invading Gurkha army. The main gate to the city of Lhasa used to run through the large Pargo Kaling chorten and contained holy relics of the Buddha Mindukpa.

In 2000 the urbanised area covered 53 square kilometres (20 sq mi), with a population of around 170,000. Official statistics of the metropolitan area report that 70 percent are Tibetan, 24.3 are Han, and the remaining 2.7 Hui, though outside observers suspect that non-Tibetans account for some 50–70 percent. According to the Sixth Population Census in 2010, the population of Tibetans is 429,104, accounting for 76.70% of the total population of Lhasa. The second most populous ethnic group is the Han Chinese, with a population of 121,065, accounting for 21.64% of Lhasa's total population. These two ethnic groups account for the vast majority of Lhasa's total population, while other ethnic minorities account for only about 1.66% of Lhasa's total population.

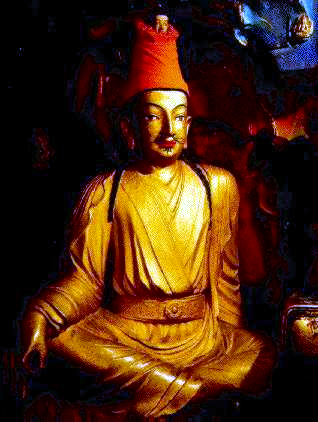
Songtsen Gampo

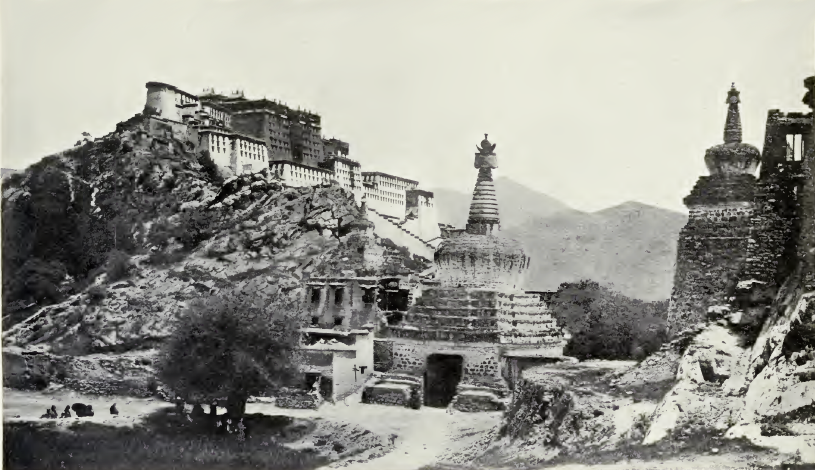
Lhasa's (western gate)—the Tibetans called this chorten, Pargo Kaling pictured here at the time of the 1904 British expedition to Tibet.

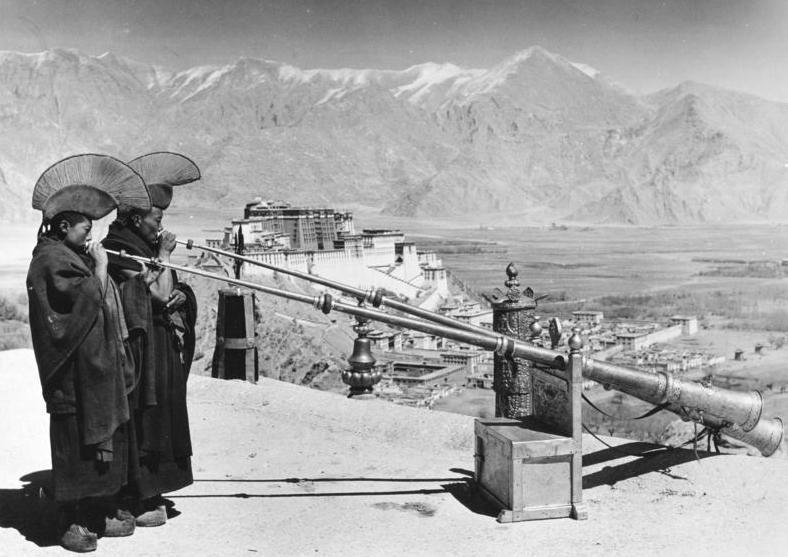
1938 Lhasa with the Potala as seen from the roof of Men-Tsee-Khang (Tibetan Medical College) founded by the 13th Dalai Lama

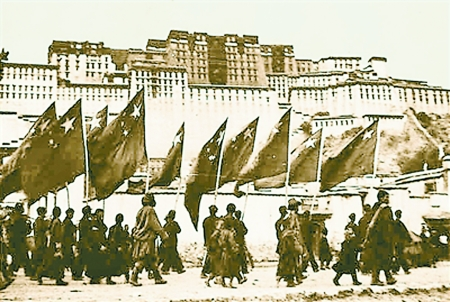
On 26 October 1951, the advance troops of the Chinese People's Liberation Army marched into Lhasa with red flags in their hands.

== Geography ==
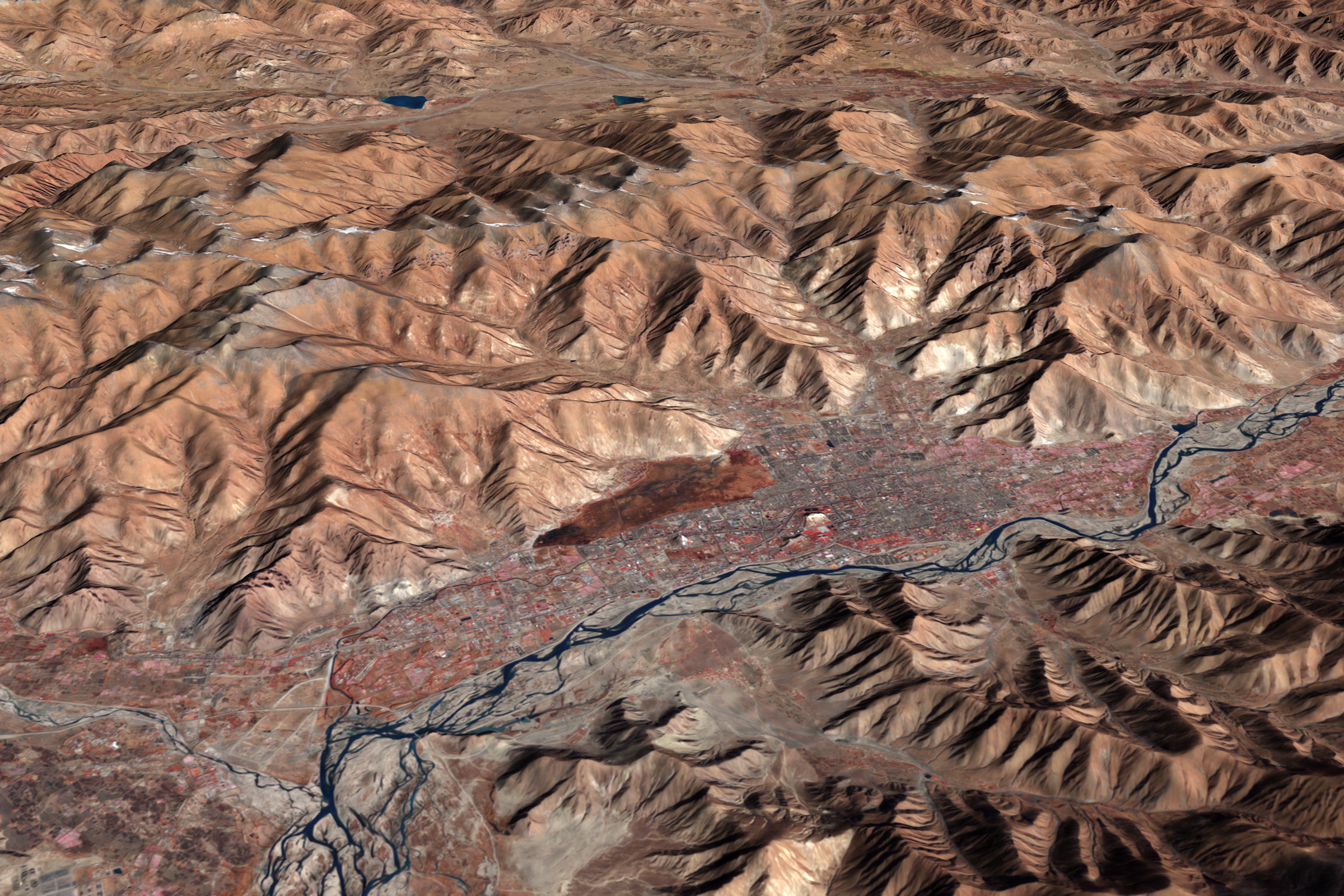
Lhasa sits in a flat river valley

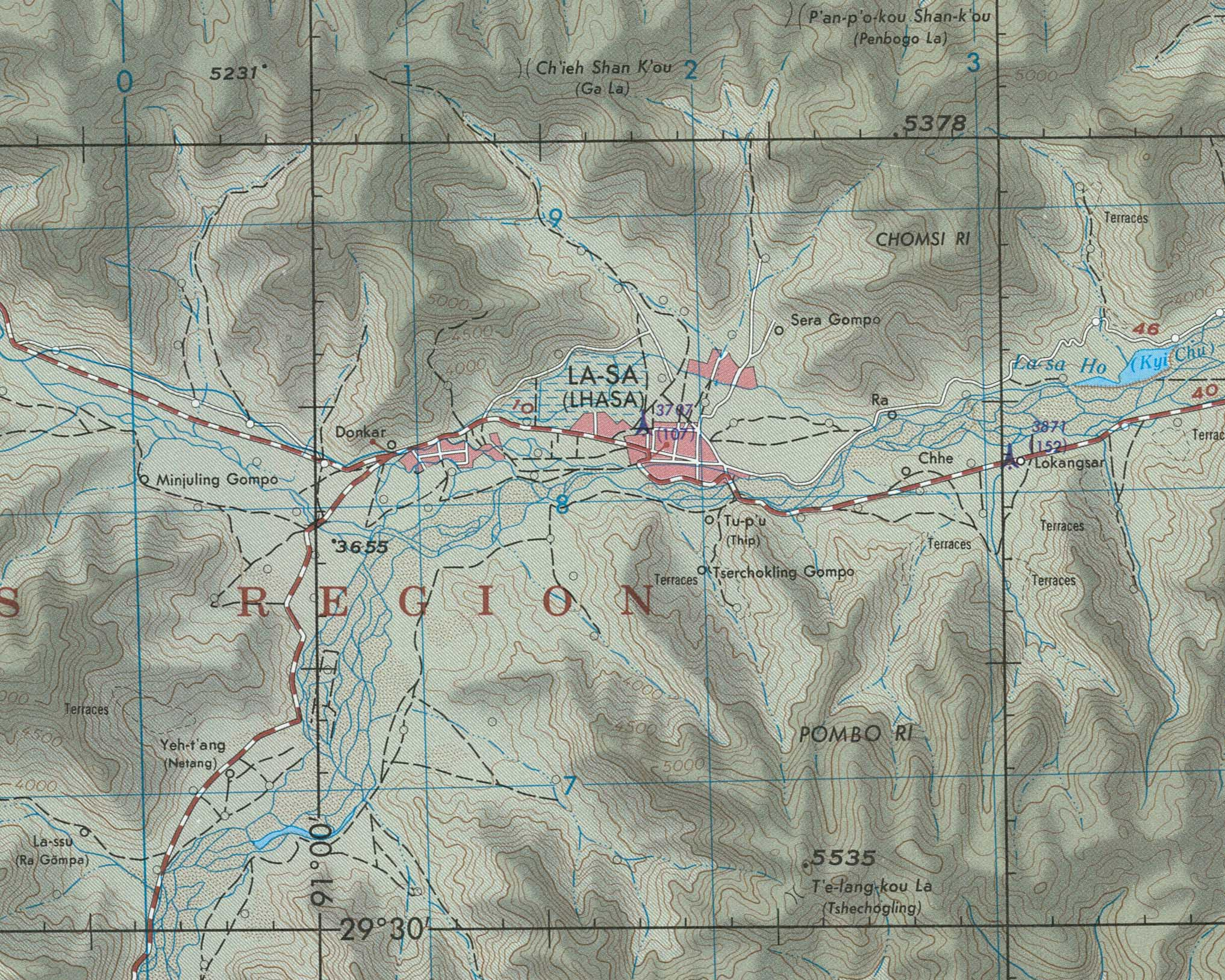
Map including Lhasa (DMA, 1973)

Lhasa has an elevation of about 3,600 m (11,800 ft) and lies in the centre of the Tibetan Plateau with the surrounding mountains rising to 5,500 m (18,000 ft). The air only contains 68 percent of the oxygen compared to sea level. The Lhasa River, also Kyi River or Kyi Chu, a tributary of the Yarlung Zangbo River (Brahmaputra River), runs through the southern part of the city. This river, known to local Tibetans as the "merry blue waves", flows through the snow-covered peaks and gullies of the Nyainqêntanglha mountains, extending 315 km (196 mi), and emptying into the Yarlung Zangbo River at Qüxü, forms an area of great scenic beauty. The marshlands, mostly uninhabited, are to the north. Ingress and egress roads run east and west, while to the north, the road infrastructure is less developed.

=== Administration ===
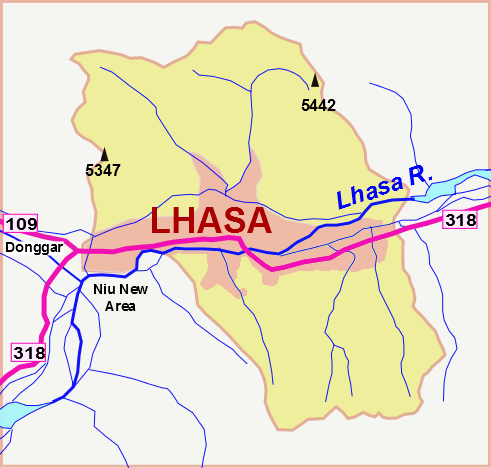
The built-up area (pink) within the Chengguan District (yellow)

Chengguan District is located on the middle reaches of the Lhasa River, a tributary of the Brahmaputra River, with land that rises to the north and south of the river. It is 28 kilometres (17 mi) from east to west and 31 kilometres (19 mi) from north to south. Chengguan District is bordered by Doilungdêqên District to the west, Dagzê County to the east and Lhünzhub County to the north. Gonggar County of Lhoka (Shannan) Prefecture lies to the south.

Chengguan District has an elevation of 3,650 metres (11,980 ft) and covers 525 square kilometres (203 sq mi). The urban built-up area covers 60 square kilometres (23 sq mi).The average annual temperature of 8 °C (46 °F). Annual precipitation is about 300 millimetres (12 in) to 500 millimetres (20 in), mostly falling between July and September.

The term "Chengguan District" is the administrative term for the inner urban area or the urban centre within a prefecture, in this case the prefectural-city of Lhasa. Outside of the urban area much of Chengguan District is mainly mountainous with a near nonexistent rural population. Chengguan District is at the same administrative level as a county. Chengguan District of Lhasa was established on 23 April 1961. It currently has 12 fully urban subdistricts.

Name	Tibetan	Tibetan Pinyin	Chinese	Pinyin	Population (2010)
Pargor Subdistrict	བར་སྒོར་ཁྲོམ་གཞུང་།	Pargor Tromzhung	八廓街道	Bākuò Jiēdào	92,107
Gyirai Subdistrict	སྐྱིད་རས་ཁྲོམ་གཞུང་།	Gyirai Tromzhung	吉日街道	Jírì Jiēdào	21,022
Jêbumgang Subdistrict	རྗེ་འབུམ་སྒང་ཁྲོམ་གཞུང་།	Jêbumgang Tromzhung	吉崩岗街道	Jíbēnggǎng Jiēdào	29,984
Chabxi Subdistrict	གྲ་བཞི་ཁྲོམ་གཞུང་།	Chabxi Tromzhung	扎细街道	Zāxì Jiēdào	30,820
Gündêling Subdistrict	ཀུན་བདེ་གླིང་ཁྲོམ་གཞུང་།	Gündêling Tromzhung	公德林街道	Gōngdélín Jiēdào	55,404
Garmagoinsar Subdistrict	ཀརྨ་མ་ཀུན་བཟང་ཁྲོམ་གཞུང་།	Garmagoinsar Tromzhung	嘎玛贡桑街道	Gámǎgòngsāng Jiēdào	19,472
Liangdao Subdistrict	གླིང་ཕྲན་གཉིས་ཀྱི་ཁྲོམ་གཞུང་།	Lingchain Nyi'gyi Tromzhung	两岛街道	Liǎngdǎo Jiēdào	14,055
Jinzhu West Road Subdistrict	བཅིངས་འགྲོལ་ནུབ་ལམ་ཁྲོམ་གཞུང་།	Jingzhoi Nublam Tromzhung	金珠西路街道	Jīnzhū Xīlù Jiēdào	established in 2013
Ngaqên Subdistrict	སྣ་ཆེན་ཁྲོམ་གཞུང་།	Ngaqên Tromzhung	纳金街道	Nàjīn Jiēdào	29,575
Togdê Subdistrict	དོག་སྡེ་ཁྲོམ་གཞུང་།	Togdê Tromzhung	夺底街道	Duóde Jiēdào	15,186
Caigungtang Subdistrict	ཚལ་གུང་ཐང་ཁྲོམ་གཞུང་།	Caigungtang Tromzhung	蔡公堂街道	Càigōngtáng Jiēdào	8,800
Nyangrain Subdistrict	ཉང་བྲན་ཁྲོམ་གཞུང་།	Nyangrain Tromzhung	娘热街道	Niángrè Jiēdào	26,354

=== Climate ===
Owing to its very high elevation, Lhasa has a cool semi-arid climate (Köppen: BSk), bordering on both a monsoon-influenced subtropical highland climate (Köppen: Cwb) and a humid continental climate (Köppen: Dwb), with frosty winters and mild summers, yet the valley location protects the city from intense cold or heat and strong winds. Monthly possible sunshine ranges from 53 percent in July to 84 percent in November, and the city receives nearly 3,000 hours of sunlight annually. It is thus sometimes called the "sunlit city" by Tibetans. The coldest month is January with an average temperature of 0.6 °C (33.1 °F) and the warmest month is June and July with a daily average of 17.5 °C (63.5 °F), though nights have generally been warmer in July. The annual mean temperature is 9.9 °C (49.8 °F), with extreme temperatures ranging from −16.5 to 30.8 °C (2 to 87 °F) on 17 January 1968 and 24 June 2019 respectively. Lhasa has an annual precipitation of 458 millimetres (18.0 in) with rain falling mainly in July, August and September. The driest month is December at 0.3 millimetres (0.01 in) and the wettest month is August, at 133.5 millimetres (5.26 in). Summer is widely regarded the "best" of the year as rains come mostly at night and Lhasa is still sunny during the daytime.

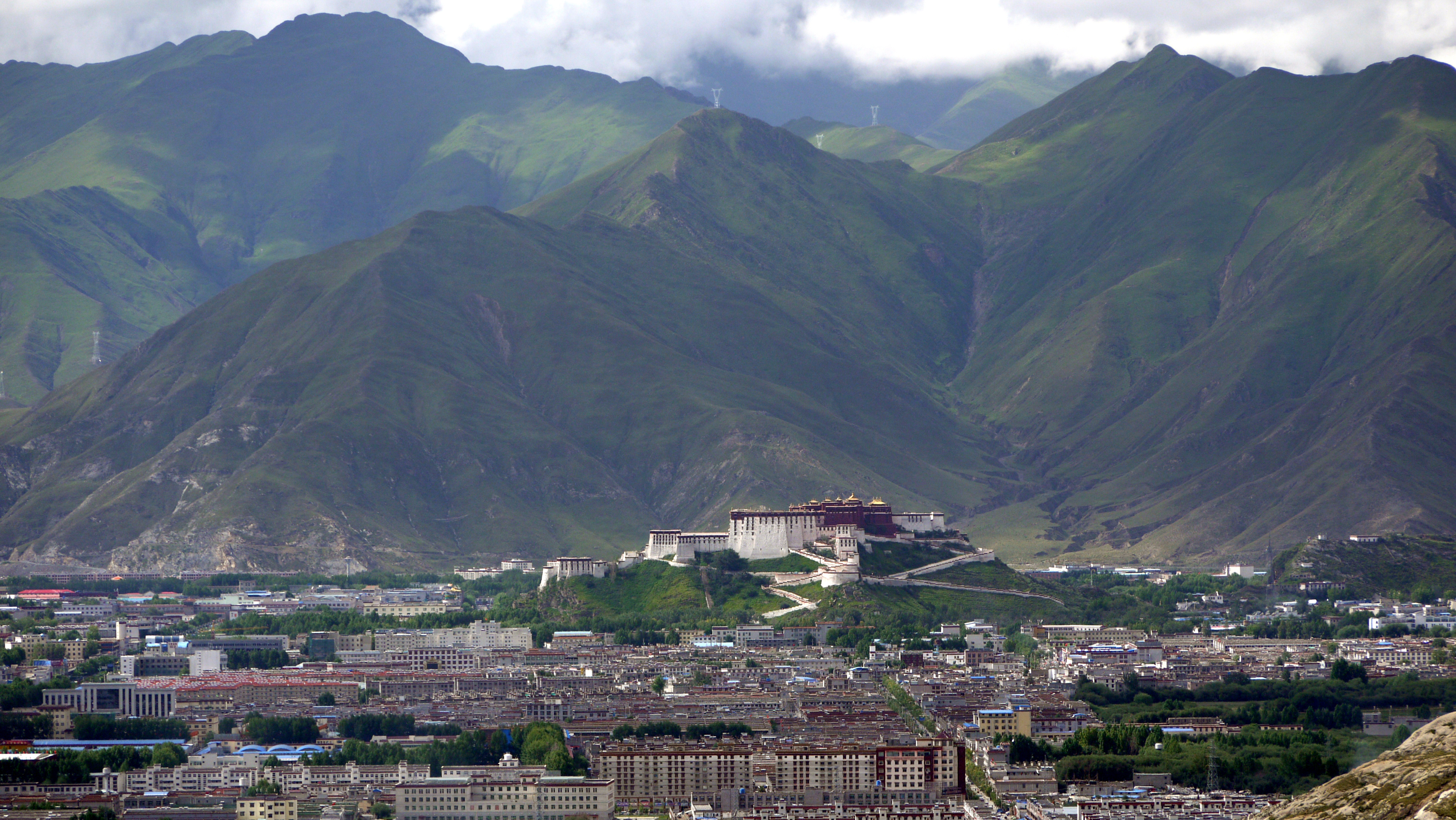
Lhasa from the Pabonka Monastery

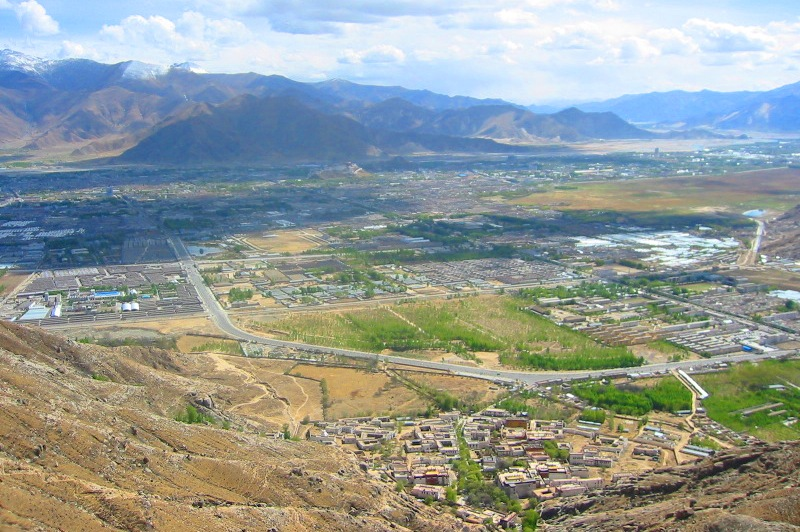
Lhasa Valley

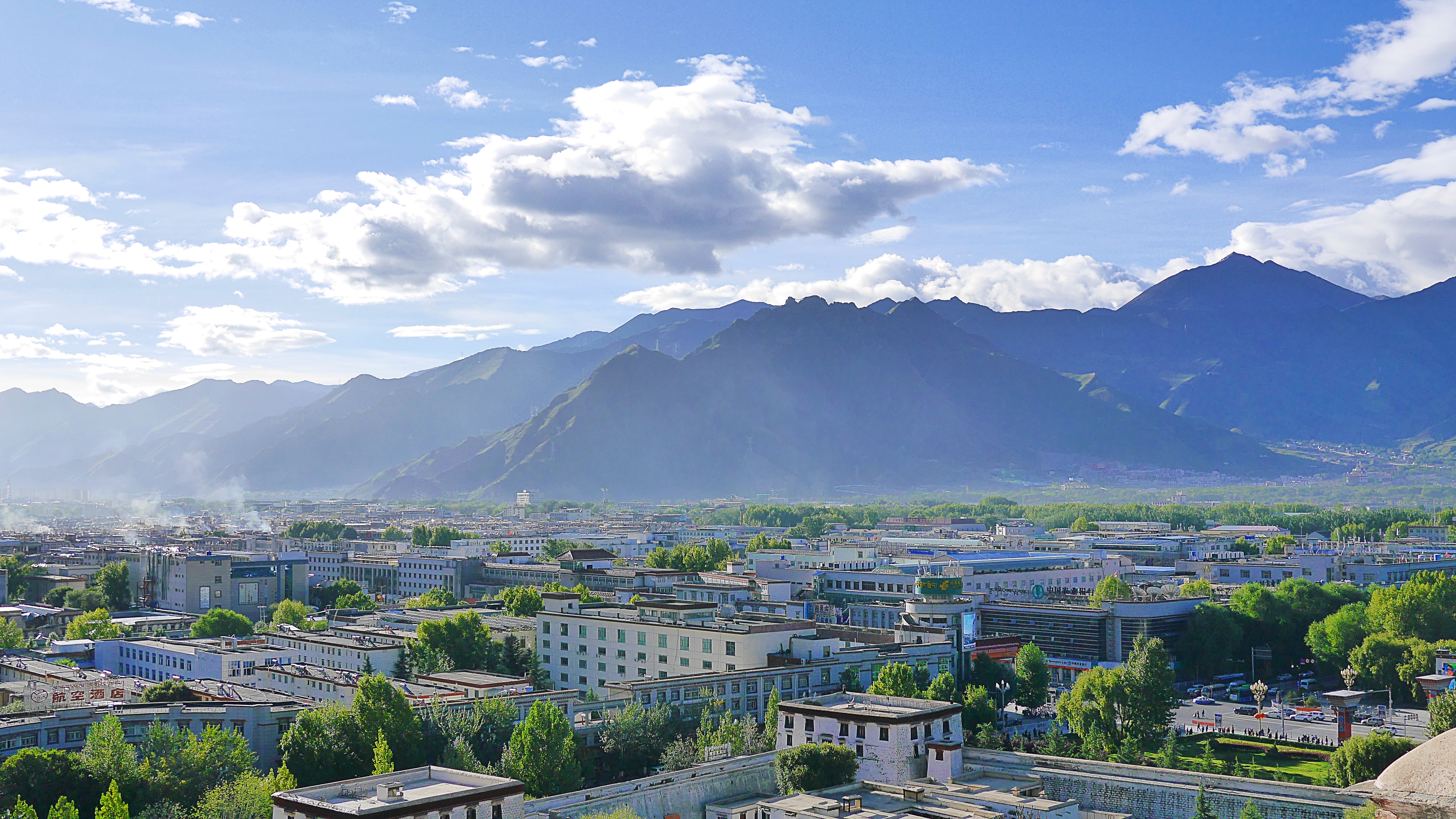
View of Lhasa, 2017

Climate data for Lhasa, elevation 3,649 m (11,972 ft), (1991–2020 normals, extremes 1951–present)
Month	Jan	Feb	Mar	Apr	May	Jun	Jul	Aug	Sep	Oct	Nov	Dec	Year
Record high °C (°F)	20.5 (68.9)	21.3 (70.3)	25.1 (77.2)	25.9 (78.6)	29.4 (84.9)	30.8 (87.4)	30.4 (86.7)	27.2 (81.0)	26.5 (79.7)	24.8 (76.6)	22.8 (73.0)	20.1 (68.2)	30.8 (87.4)
Mean daily maximum °C (°F)	8.3 (46.9)	10.4 (50.7)	13.4 (56.1)	16.5 (61.7)	20.5 (68.9)	23.9 (75.0)	23.3 (73.9)	22.3 (72.1)	21.1 (70.0)	17.9 (64.2)	13.3 (55.9)	9.7 (49.5)	16.7 (62.1)
Daily mean °C (°F)	0.6 (33.1)	3.1 (37.6)	6.5 (43.7)	9.8 (49.6)	13.8 (56.8)	17.5 (63.5)	17.5 (63.5)	16.7 (62.1)	15.2 (59.4)	10.8 (51.4)	5.4 (41.7)	1.7 (35.1)	9.9 (49.8)
Mean daily minimum °C (°F)	−7.1 (19.2)	−4.2 (24.4)	−0.5 (31.1)	3.1 (37.6)	7.1 (44.8)	11.1 (52.0)	11.7 (53.1)	11.1 (52.0)	9.3 (48.7)	3.7 (38.7)	−2.5 (27.5)	−6.3 (20.7)	3.0 (37.5)
Record low °C (°F)	−16.5 (2.3)	−15.4 (4.3)	−13.6 (7.5)	−8.1 (17.4)	−2.7 (27.1)	2.0 (35.6)	4.5 (40.1)	3.3 (37.9)	0.3 (32.5)	−7.2 (19.0)	−11.2 (11.8)	−16.1 (3.0)	−16.5 (2.3)
Average precipitation mm (inches)	0.9 (0.04)	1.9 (0.07)	3.5 (0.14)	8.3 (0.33)	31.1 (1.22)	84.0 (3.31)	140.5 (5.53)	129.8 (5.11)	64.8 (2.55)	6.5 (0.26)	0.9 (0.04)	0.7 (0.03)	472.9 (18.63)
Average precipitation days (≥ 0.1 mm)	0.6	1.2	2.4	5.2	9.5	14.4	19.8	19.1	13.5	3.5	0.6	0.5	90.3
Average snowy days	1.3	2.2	5.5	5.6	0.9	0	0	0	0.1	1.1	1.3	0.7	18.7
Average relative humidity (%)	25	24	27	36	41	48	59	61	57	43	32	27	40
Mean monthly sunshine hours	250.0	234.4	256.0	254.3	279.8	260.4	227.5	223.5	238.4	280.6	266.2	256.5	3,027.6
Percentage possible sunshine	77	74	68	65	66	62	54	55	65	80	84	81	69
Source: China Meteorological Administration all-time extreme temperature

== Demographics ==
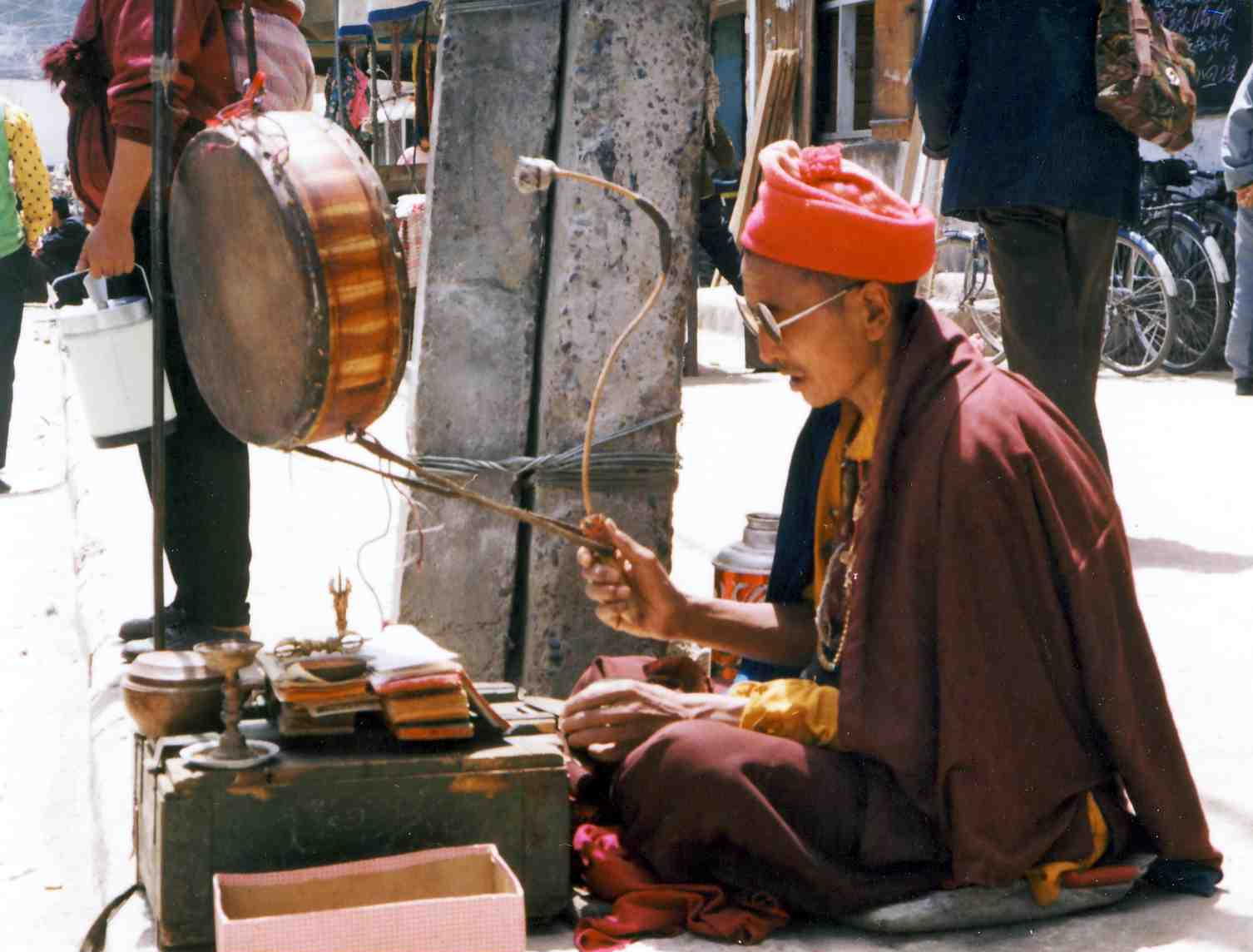
Mendicant monk in Chengguan District, Lhasa, 1993

=== Demographics in the past ===
The 11th edition of Encyclopædia Britannica published between 1910 and 1911 noted the total population of Lhasa, including the lamas in the city and vicinity was about 30,000, A census in 1854 made the figure 42,000, but it is known to have greatly decreased afterwards. Britannica noted that within Lhasa, there were about a total of 1,500 resident Tibetan laymen and about 5,500 Tibetan women. The permanent population also included Chinese families (about 2,000). The city's residents included traders from Nepal and Ladakh (about 800), and a few from Bhutan, Mongolia and other places. The Britannica noted with interest that the Chinese had a crowded burial-ground at Lhasa, tended carefully after their manner and that the Nepalese supplied mechanics and metal-workers at that time.

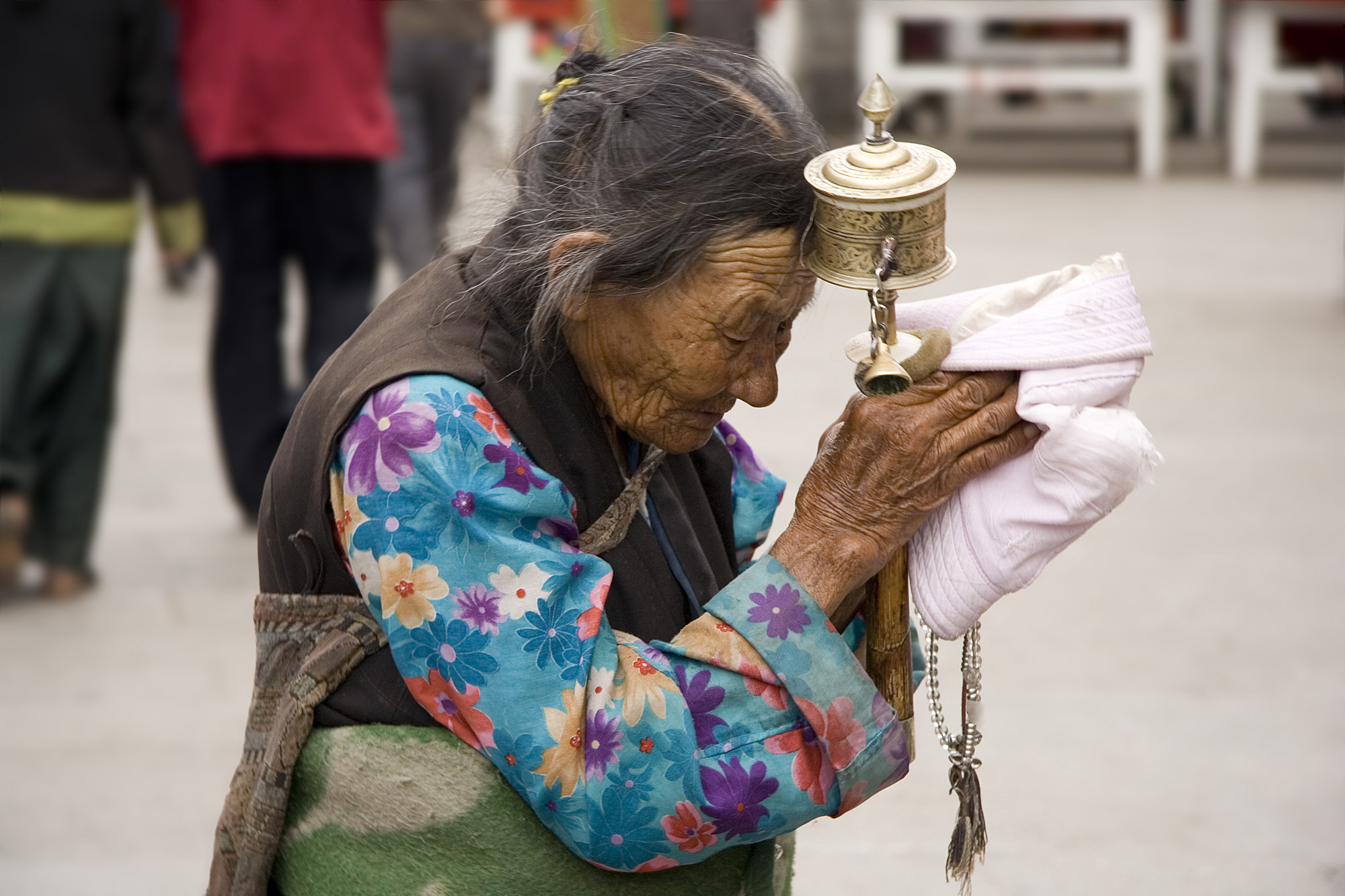
An elderly Tibetan woman holding a prayer wheel on the street in Chengguan District, Lhasa

In the first half of the 20th century, several Western explorers made celebrated journeys to the city, including William Montgomery McGovern, Francis Younghusband, Alexandra David-Néel, and Heinrich Harrer. Lhasa was the centre of Tibetan Buddhism as nearly half of its population were monks, Though this figure may include monks from surrounding monasteries who travelled to Lhasa for various celebrations and were not ordinarily resident there.

The majority of the pre-1950 Chinese population of Lhasa were merchants and officials. In the Lubu section of Lhasa, the inhabitants were descendants of Chinese vegetable farmers, some of whom married Tibetan wives. They came to Lhasa in the 1840s–1860s after a Chinese official was appointed to the position of Amban.

According to one writer, the population of the city was about 10,000, with some 10,000 monks at Drepung and Sera monasteries in 1959. Hugh Richardson, on the other hand, puts the population of Lhasa in 1952, at "some 25,000–30,000—about 45,000–50,000 if the population of the great monasteries on its outskirts be included."

=== Contemporary demographics ===
Young people wearing traditional chuba in front of Potala Palace

The total population of Lhasa Prefecture-level City is 521,500 (including known migrant population but excluding military garrisons). Of this, 257,400 are in the urban area (including a migrant population of 100,700), while 264,100 are outside. Nearly half of Lhasa Prefecture-level City's population lives in Chengguan District, which is the administrative division that contains the urban area of Lhasa (i.e. the actual city).

The urban area is populated by ethnic Tibetans, Han, Hui and other ethnic groups. The 2000 official census gave a total population of 223,001, of which 171,719 lived in the areas administered by city street offices and city neighborhood committees. 133,603 had urban registrations and 86,395 had rural registrations, based on their place of origin. The census was taken in November, when many of the ethnic Han workers in seasonal industries such as construction would have been away from Tibet, and did not count the military. A 2011 book estimated that up to two-thirds of the city's residents are non-Tibetan, although the government states that Chengguan District as a whole is still 63% ethnic Tibetan. As of 2014, half of Tibet's Han population resided in the district, and bilingual or wholly Chinese teaching was common in the schools.

== Economy ==
Traditional storefront facades

Competitive industry together with feature economy play key roles in the development of Lhasa. With the view to maintaining a balance between population growth and the environment, tourism and service industries are emphasised as growth engines for the future. Many of Lhasa's rural residents practice traditional agriculture and animal husbandry. Lhasa is also the traditional hub of the Tibetan trading network. For many years, chemical and car making plants operated in the area and this resulted in significant pollution, a factor which has changed in recent years. Copper, lead and zinc are mined nearby and there is ongoing experimentation regarding new methods of mineral mining and geothermal heat extraction.

Agriculture and animal husbandry in Lhasa are considered to be of a high standard. People mainly plant highland barley and winter wheat. The resources of water conservancy, geothermal heating, solar energy and various mines are abundant. There is widespread electricity together with the use of both machinery and traditional methods in the production of such things as textiles, leathers, plastics, matches and embroidery. The production of national handicrafts has made great progress.

Shops along the Barkhor

With the growth of tourism and service sectors, the sunset industries which cause serious pollution are expected to fade in the hope of building a healthy ecological system. Environmental problems such as soil erosion, acidification, and loss of vegetation are being addressed. The tourism industry now brings significant business to the region, building on the attractiveness of the Potala Palace, the Jokang, the Norbulingka Summer Palace and surrounding large monasteries as well the spectacular Himalayan landscape together with the many wild plants and animals native to the high altitudes of Central Asia. Tourism to Tibet dropped sharply following the crackdown on protests in 2008, but as early as 2009, the industry was recovering. Chinese authorities plan an ambitious growth of tourism in the region aiming at 10 million visitors by 2020; these visitors are expected to be domestic. With renovation around historic sites, such as the Potala Palace, UNESCO has expressed "concerns about the deterioration of Lhasa's traditional cityscape."

Hotel in Lhasa

Lhasa contains several hotels. Lhasa Hotel is a 4-star hotel located northeast of Norbulingka in the western suburbs of the city. Completed in September 1985, it is the flagship of CITS's installations in Tibet. It accommodates about 1000 guests and visitors to Lhasa. There are over 450 rooms (suites) in the hotel, and all are equipped with air conditioning, mini-bar and other basic facilities. Some of the rooms are decorated in traditional Tibetan style. The hotel was operated by Holiday Inn from 1986 to 1997 and is the subject of a book, The Hotel on the Roof of the World. Another hotel of note is the historical Banak Shöl Hotel, located at 8 Beijing Road in the city. It is known for its distinctive wooden verandas.

Lhasa contains several businesses of note. Lhasa Carpet Factory, a factory south of Yanhe Dong Lu near the Tibet University, produces traditional Tibetan rugs that are exported worldwide. It is a modern factory, the largest manufacturer of rugs throughout Tibet, employing some 300 workers. Traditionally Tibetan women were the weavers, and men the spinners, but both work on the rugs today.

The Lhasa Brewery Company was established in 1988 on the northern outskirts of Lhasa, south of Sera Monastery and is the highest commercial brewery in the world at 11,975 feet (3,650 m) and accounts for 85 percent of contemporary beer production in Tibet. The brewery, consisting of five-story buildings, cost an estimated US$20–25 million, and by 1994, production had reached 30,000 bottles per day, employing some 200 workers by this time. Since 2000, the Carlsberg group has increased its stronghold in the Chinese market and has become increasingly influential in the country with investment and expertise. Carlsberg invested in the Lhasa Brewery in recent years and has drastically improved the brewing facility and working conditions, renovating and expanding the building to what now covers 62,240 square metres (15.3 acres).

== Architecture and cityscape ==
Lhasa has many sites of historic interest, including the Potala Palace, Jokhang Temple, Sera Monastery and Norbulingka. The Potala Palace, Jokhang Temple and the Norbulingka are part of the UNESCO World Heritage Site. However, many important sites were damaged or destroyed mostly, but not solely, during China's Cultural Revolution of the 1960s. Many have been restored since the 1980s.

The Potala Palace, named after Mount Potala, the abode of Chenrezig or Avalokitesvara, was the chief residence of the Dalai Lama. After the 14th Dalai Lama fled to India during the 1959 Tibetan uprising, the government converted the palace into a museum. The site was used as a meditation retreat by King Songtsen Gampo, who in 637 built the first palace there in order to greet his bride Princess Wencheng of the Tang dynasty of China. Lobsang Gyatso, the Great Fifth Dalai Lama, started the construction of the Potala Palace in 1645 after one of his spiritual advisers, Konchog Chophel (d. 1646), pointed out that the site was ideal as a seat of government, situated as it is between Drepung and Sera monasteries and the old city of Lhasa. The palace underwent restoration works between 1989 and 1994, costing RMB55 million (US$6.875 million) and was inscribed to the UNESCO World Heritage List in 1994.

The Lhasa Zhol Pillar, below the Potala, dates as far back as circa 764 CE. and is inscribed with what may be the oldest known example of Tibetan writing. The pillar contains dedications to a famous Tibetan general and gives an account of his services to the king including campaigns against China which culminated in the brief capture of the Chinese capital Chang'an (modern Xi'an) in 763 CE during which the Tibetans temporarily installed as Emperor a relative of Princess Jincheng Gongzhu (Kim-sheng Kong co), the Chinese wife of Trisong Detsen's father, Me Agtsom.

Chokpori, meaning 'Iron Mountain', is a sacred hill, located south of the Potala. It is considered to be one of the four holy mountains of central Tibet and along with two other hills in Lhasa represent the "Three Protectors of Tibet.", Chokpori (Vajrapani), Pongwari (Manjushri), and Marpori (Chenrezig or Avalokiteshvara). It was the site of the most famous medical school Tibet, known as the Mentsikhang, which was founded in 1413. It was conceived of by Lobsang Gyatso, the "Great" 5th Dalai Lama, and completed by the Regent Sangye Gyatso (Sangs-rgyas rgya-mtsho) shortly before 1697.

Lingkhor is a sacred path, most commonly used to name the outer pilgrim road in Lhasa matching its inner twin, Barkhor. The Lingkhor in Lhasa was 8 kilometres (5.0 mi) long enclosing Old Lhasa, the Potala and Chokpori hill. In former times it was crowded with men and women covering its length in prostrations, beggars and pilgrims approaching the city for the first time. The road passed through willow-shaded parks where the Tibetans used to picnic in summer and watch open air operas on festival days. New Lhasa has obliterated most of Lingkhor, but one stretch still remains west of Chokpori.

The Norbulingka palace and surrounding park is situated in the west side of Lhasa, a short distance to the southwest of Potala Palace and with an area of around 36 hectares (89 acres), it is considered to be the largest man made garden in Tibet. It was built from 1755. and served as the traditional summer residence of the successive Dalai Lamas until the 14th's self-imposed exile. Norbulingka was declared a 'National Important Cultural Relic Unit", in 1988 by the State council. In 2001, the Central Committee of the Chinese Government in its 4th Tibet Session resolved to restore the complex to its original glory. The Sho Dun Festival (popularly known as the "yogurt festival") is an annual festival held at Norbulingka during the seventh Tibetan month in the first seven days of the Full Moon period, which corresponds to dates in July/August according to the Gregorian calendar.

The Barkhor is an area of narrow streets and a public square in the old part of the city located around Jokhang Temple and was the most popular devotional circumambulation for pilgrims and locals. The walk was about one kilometre (0.6 miles) long and encircled the entire Jokhang, the former seat of the State Oracle in Lhasa called the Muru Nyingba Monastery, and a number of nobles' houses including Tromzikhang and Jamkhang. There were four large incense burners (sangkangs) in the four cardinal directions, with incense burning constantly, to please the gods protecting the Jokhang. Most of the old streets and buildings have been demolished in recent times and replaced with wider streets and new buildings. Some buildings in the Barkhor were damaged in the 2008 unrest.

The Jokhang is located on Barkhor Square in the old town section of Lhasa. For most Tibetans it is the most sacred and important temple in Tibet. It is in some regards pan-sectarian, but is presently controlled by the Gelug school. Along with the Potala Palace, it is probably the most popular tourist attraction in Lhasa. It is part of the UNESCO World Heritage Site "Historic Ensemble of the Potala Palace," and a spiritual centre of Lhasa. This temple has remained a key center of Buddhist pilgrimage for centuries. The circumambulation route is known as the "kora" in Tibetan and is marked by four large stone incense burners placed at the corners of the temple complex. The Jokhang temple is a four-story construction, with roofs covered with gilded bronze tiles. The architectural style is based on the Indian vihara design, and was later extended resulting in a blend of Nepalese and Tang dynasty styles. It possesses the statues of Chenrezig, Padmasambhava and King Songtsen Gampo and his two foreign brides, Princess Wencheng (niece of Emperor Taizong of Tang) and Princess Bhrikuti of Nepal and other important items.

Ramoche Temple is considered the most important temple in Lhasa after the Jokhang Temple. Situated in the northwest of the city, it is east of the Potala and north of the Jokhang, covering a total area of 4,000 square meters (almost one acre). The temple was gutted and partially destroyed in the 1960s and its famous bronze statue disappeared. In 1983 the lower part of it was said to have been found in a Lhasa rubbish tip, and the upper half in Beijing. They have now been joined and the statue is housed in the Ramoche Temple, which was partially restored in 1986, and still showed severe damage in 1993. Following the major restoration of 1986, the main building in the temple now has three stories.

The Tibet Museum in Lhasa is the official museum of the Tibet Autonomous Region and was inaugurated on 5 October 1999. It is the first large, modern museum in the Tibet Autonomous Region and has a permanent collection of around 1000 artefacts, from examples of Tibetan art to architectural design throughout history such as Tibetan doors and construction beams. It is located in an L-shaped building west of the Potala Palace on the corner of Norbulingka Road. The museum is organized into three main sections: a main exhibition hall, a folk cultural garden and administrative offices.

The Monument to the Peaceful Liberation of Tibet was unveiled in the Potala Square in May 2002 to celebrate the 51st anniversary of the Seventeen Point Agreement for the Peaceful Liberation of Tibet, and the work in the development of the autonomous region since then. The 37-metre-high concrete monument is shaped as an abstract Mount Everest and its name is engraved with the calligraphy of former CCP general secretary and PRC president Jiang Zemin, while an inscription describes the socioeconomic development experienced in Tibet in the past fifty years.

There are four mosques in and around Lhasa. The earliest mosque, called Khache Lingka, dates to 1650 and is located west of the city, and consists of two compounds. The Lhasa Great Mosque is the most prominent and built by the early 1700s. The Dokdé Mosque, north of Lhasa, has an adjacent cemetery and is dated to 1716. The fourth mosque, commonly known as "Small Mosque" (but also Barkhor or Rapsel Alley Mosque), was built in the early 1900s.

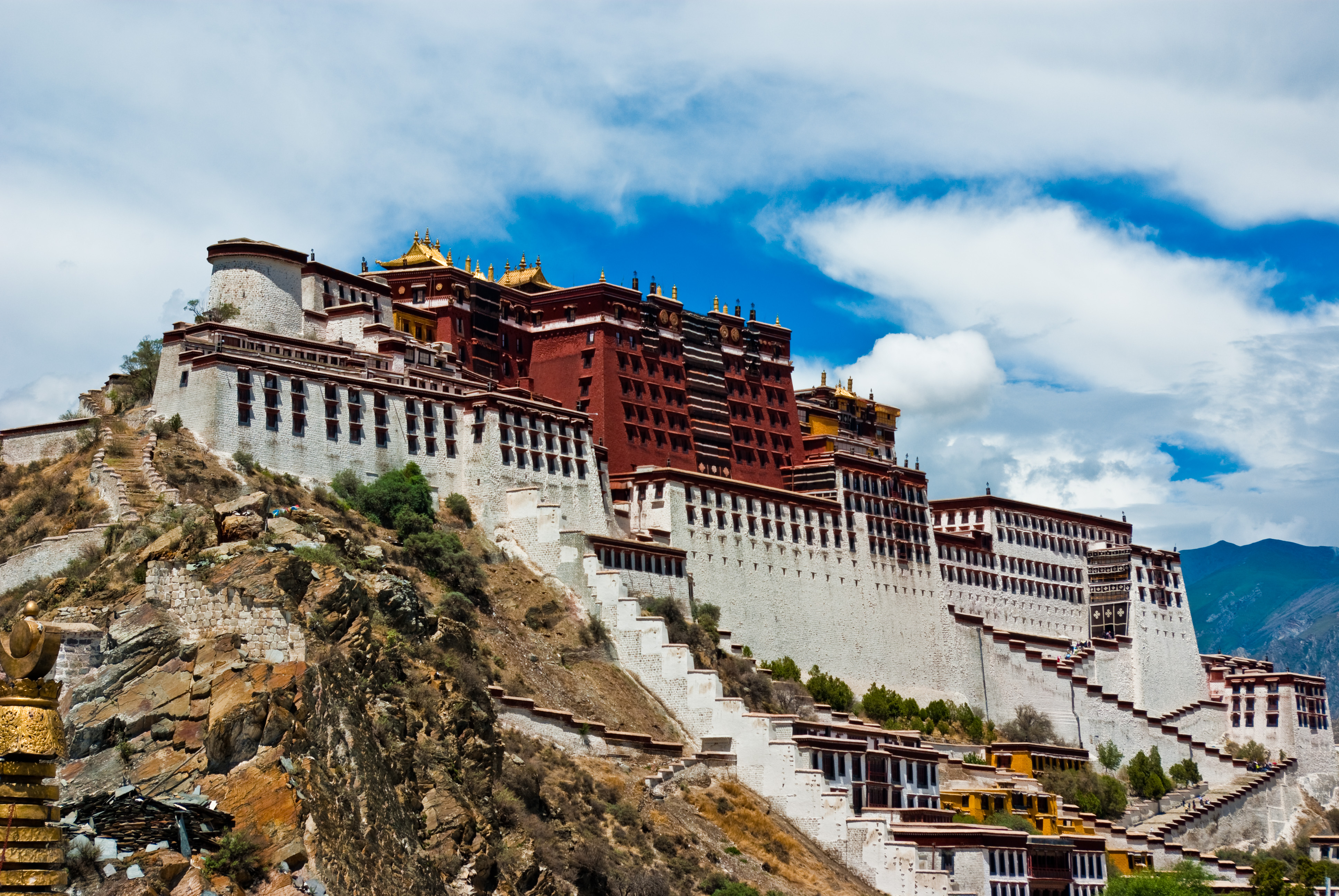
The Potala Palace

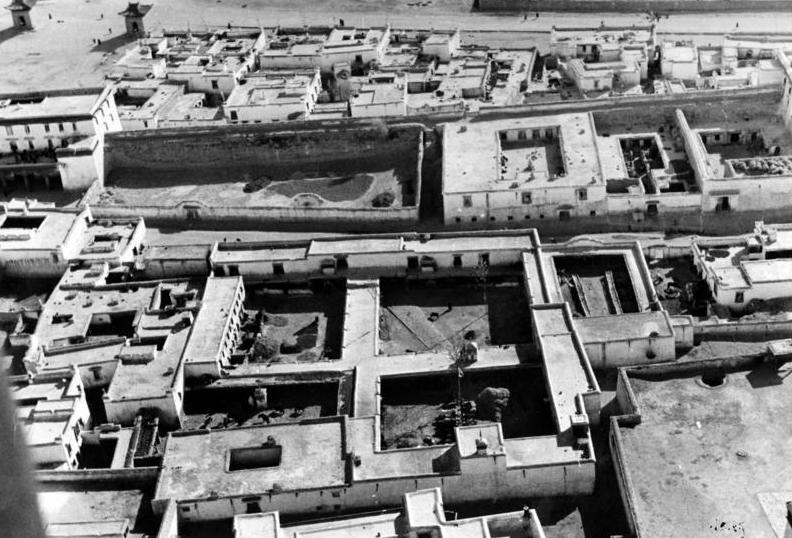
Inner and outer Zhol Village as seen from the Potala Palace in 1938.

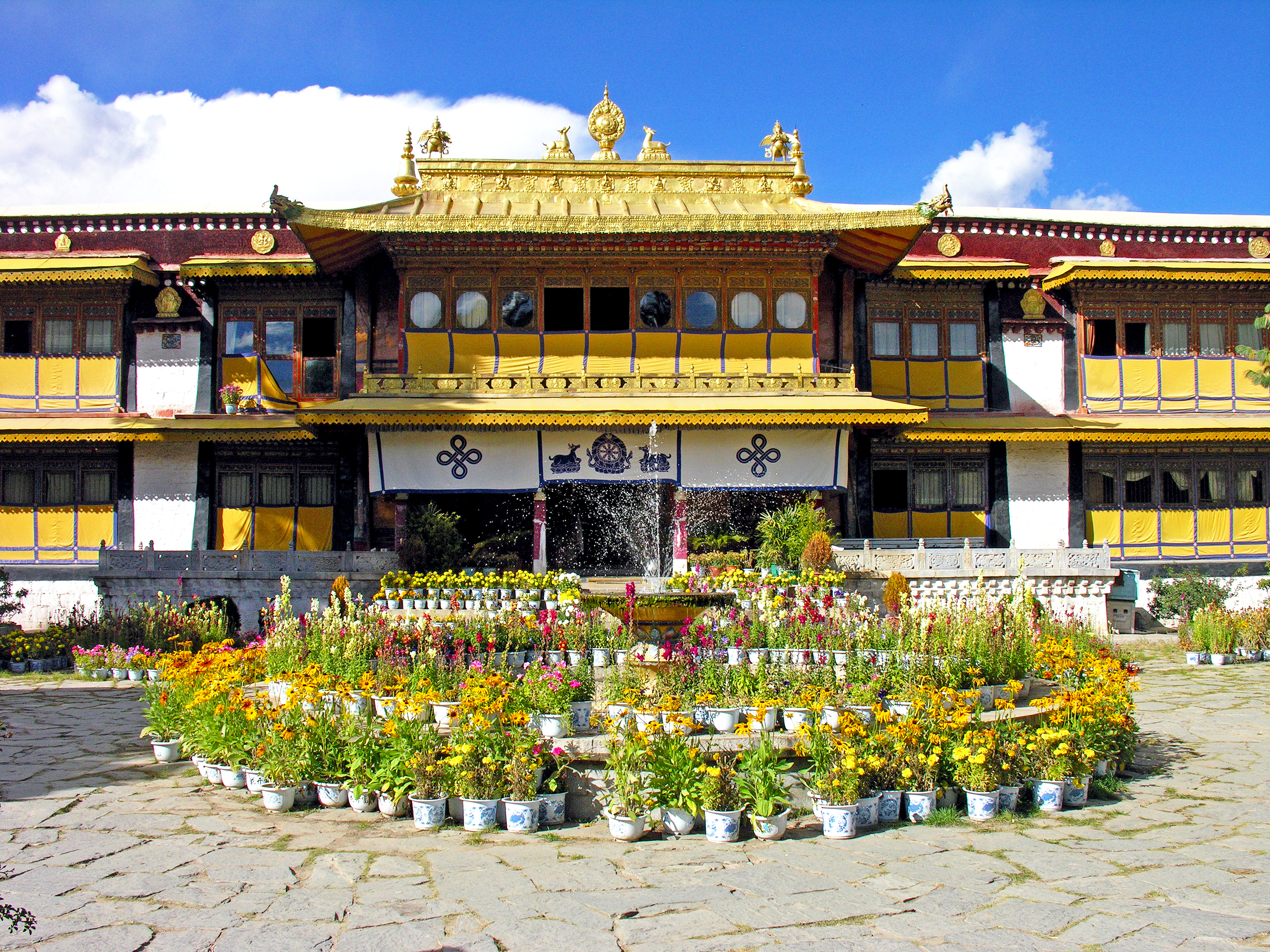
Norbulingka

Barkhor Square in front of Jokhang Monastery

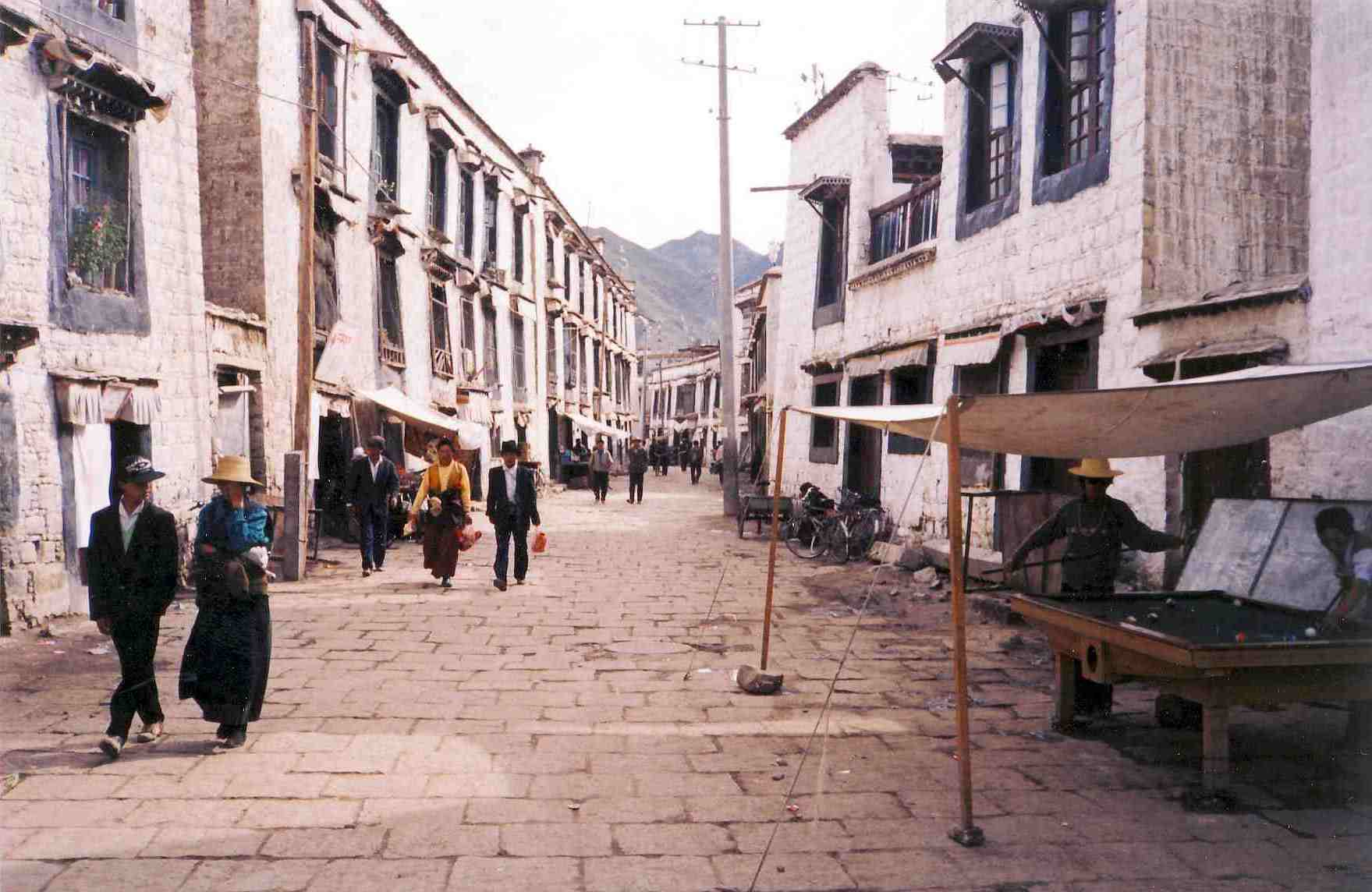
Old Barkhor street, 1993.

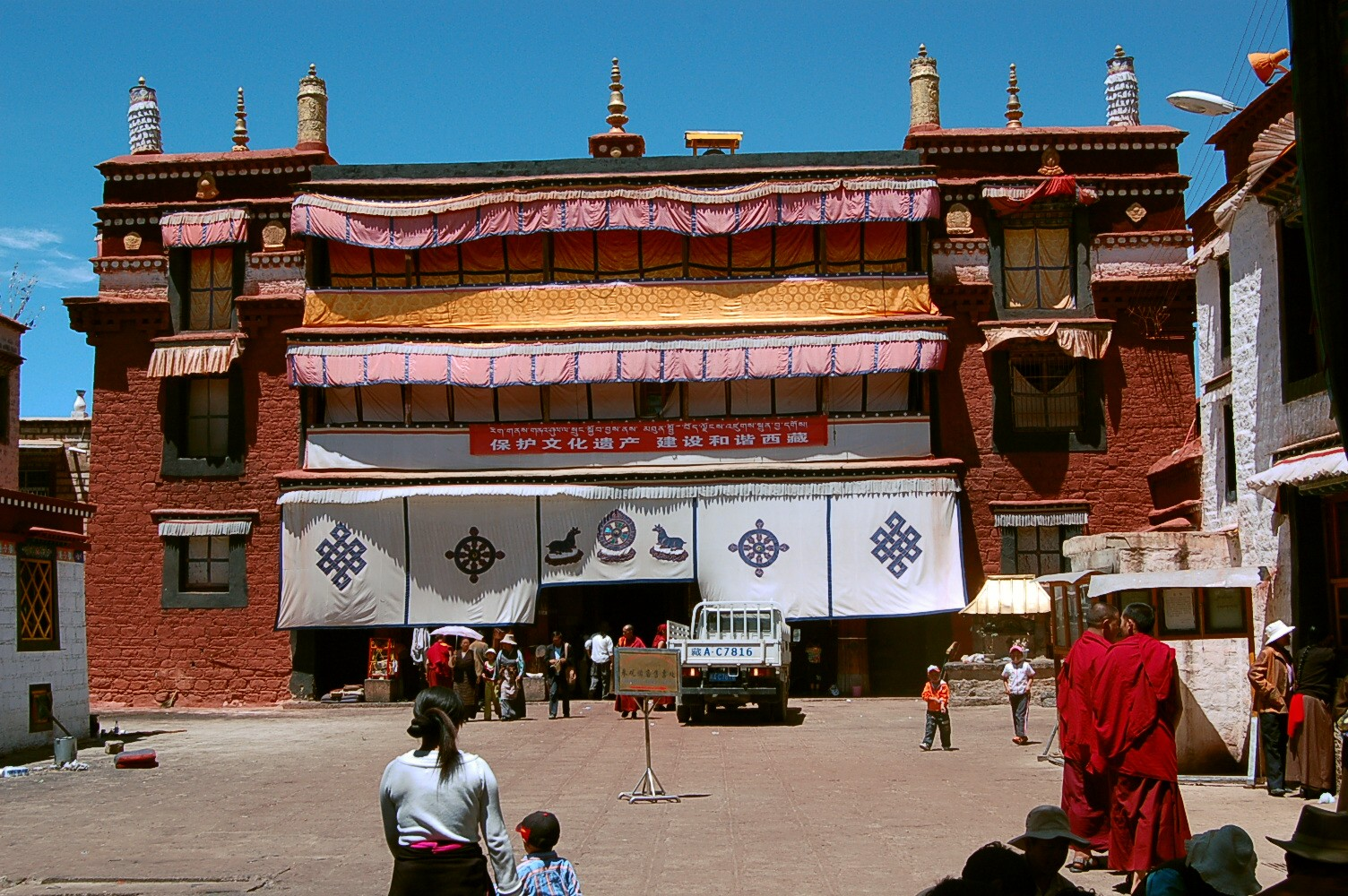
Ramoche Temple

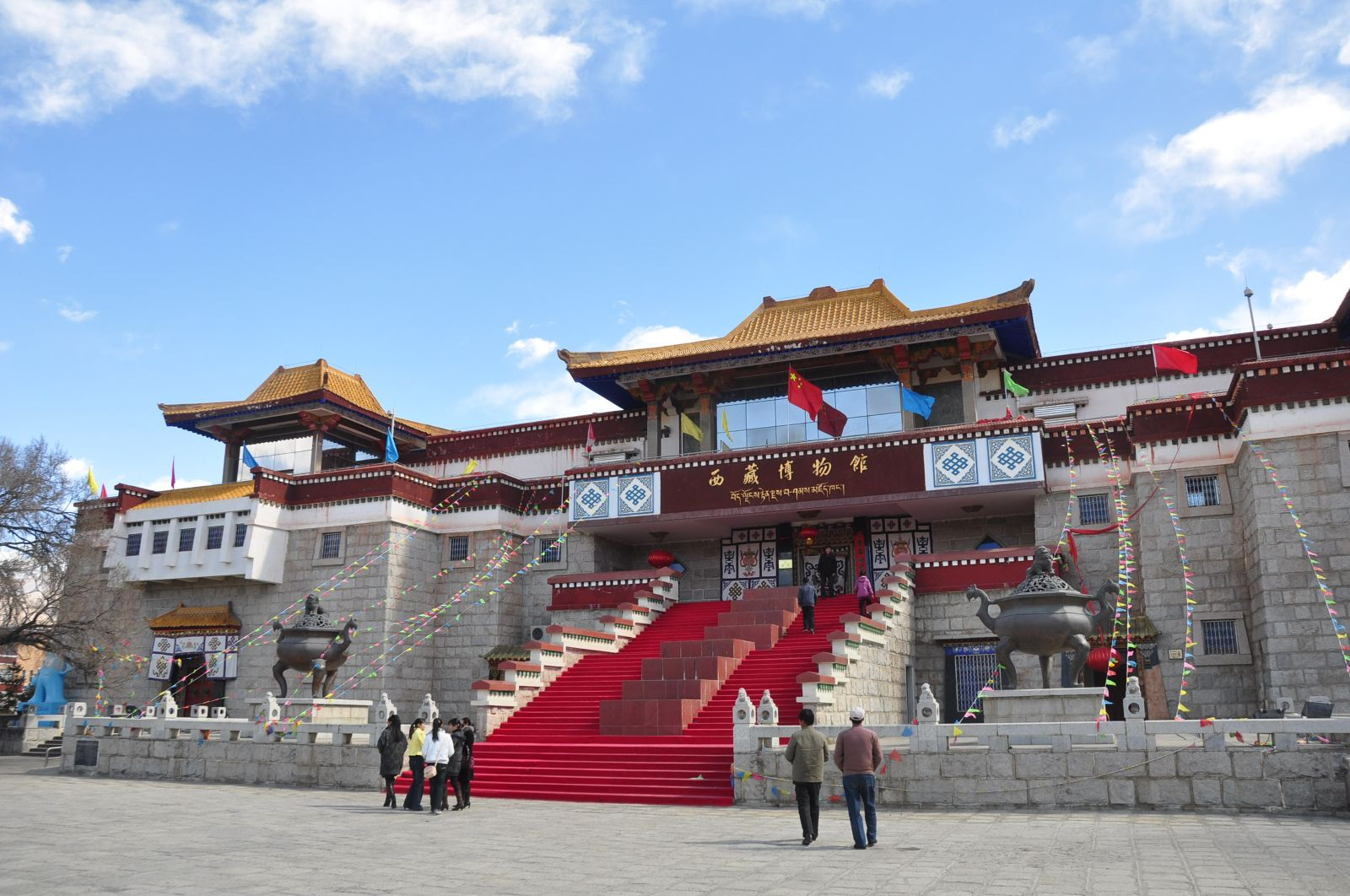
Tibet Museum

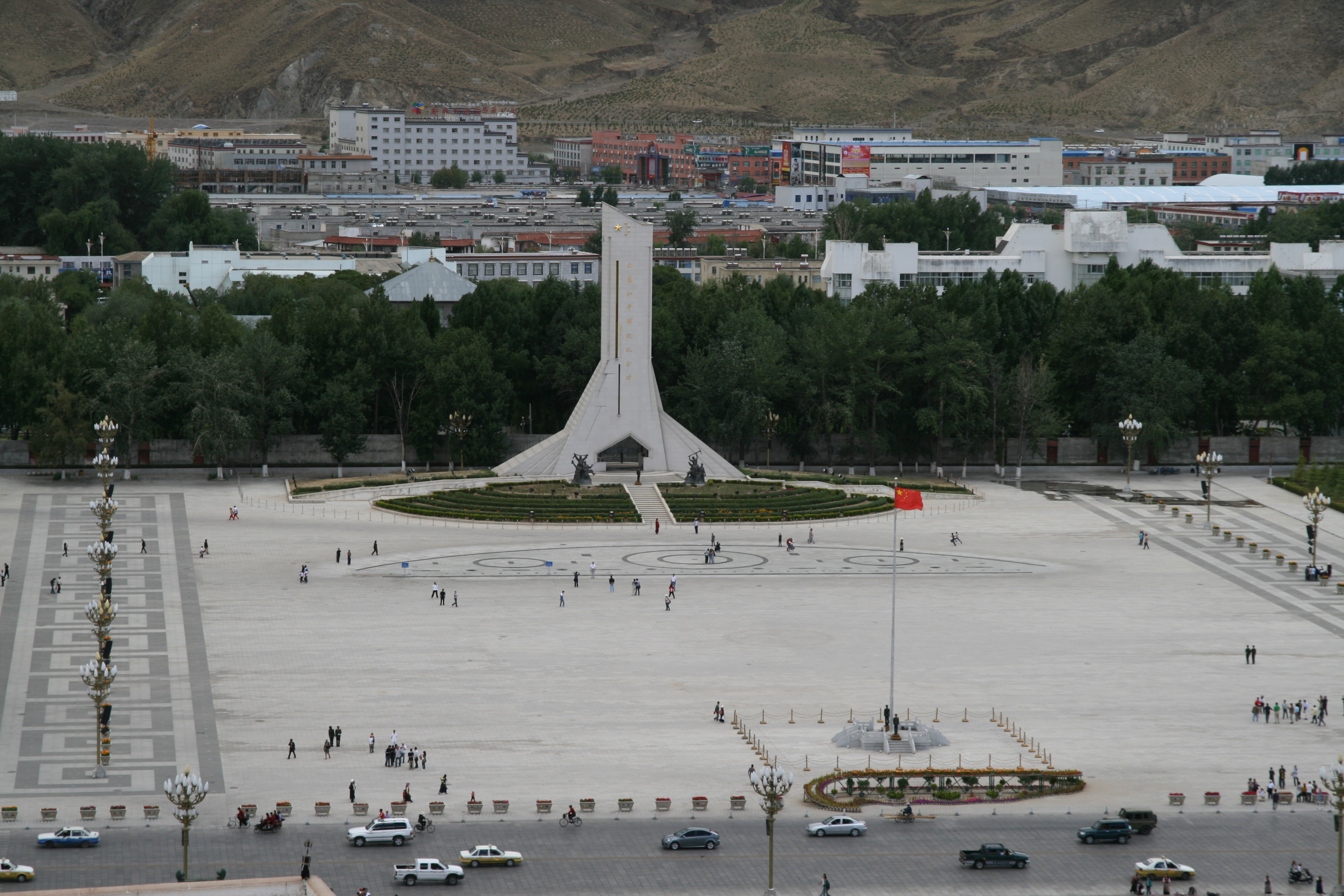
Tibet Peaceful Liberation Monument, Potala Square

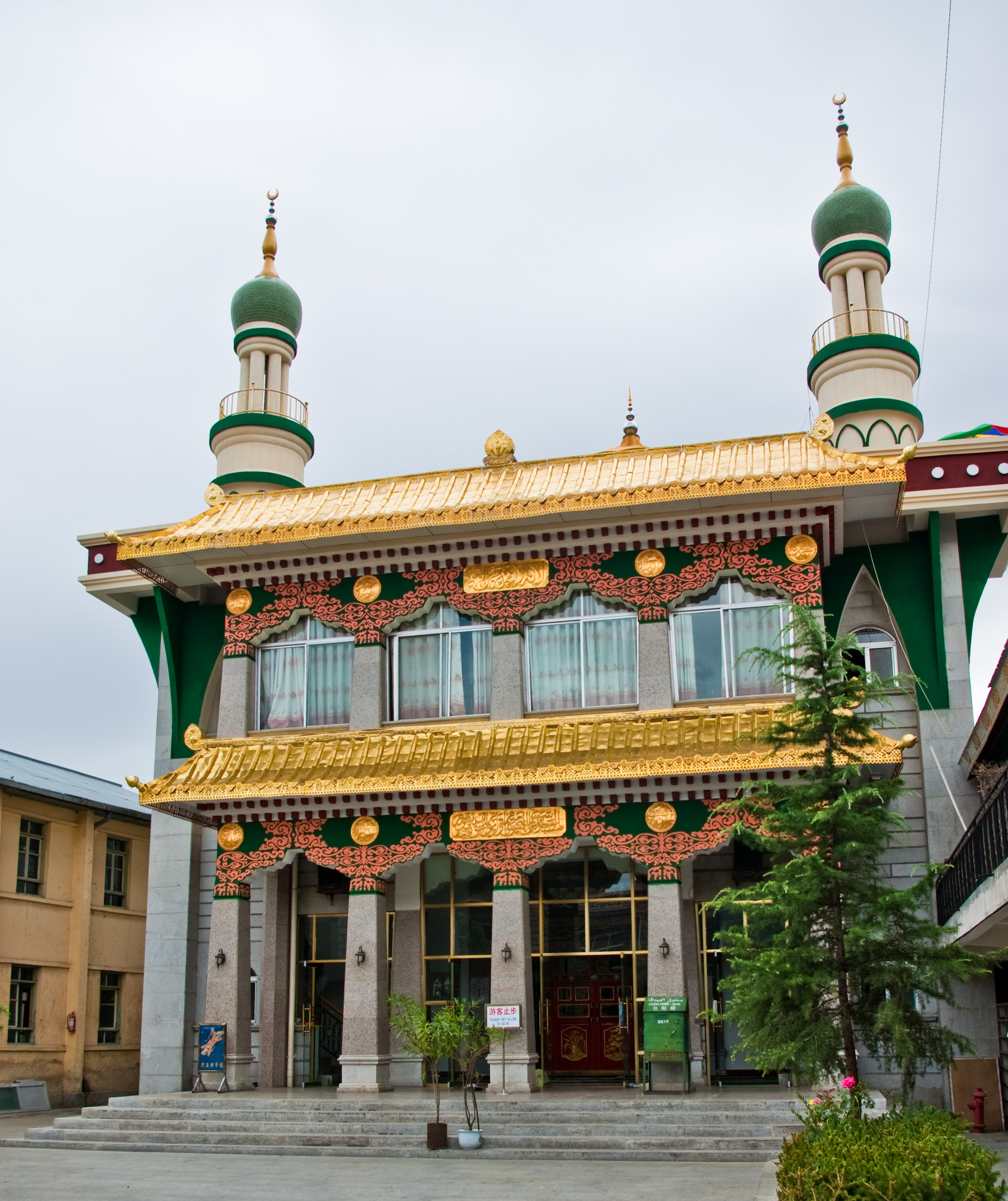
The Great Mosque of Lhasa

View of Iron Mountain from Norbulinka

== Culture ==
Tibetan opera performance, Lhasa

There are some night spots that feature cabaret acts in which performers sing in Chinese, Tibetan, and English. Dancers wear traditional Tibetan costume with long flowing cloth extending from their arms. There are a number of small bars that feature live music, although they typically have limited drink menus and cater mostly to foreign tourists.

Duihuan (སྟོད་གཞས་) is a local form of music and dance in Tibet. While the traditional Dui Huan in Tibet has only one instrument, the Dui Huan in Lhasa has four instruments: in addition to the Zainianqin and the Yangqin, there are the Jinghu, the bamboo flute, and the stringed bells that are specially used for playing the rhythm. Together with the singing, they play, pull, strum and sing.

== Education ==
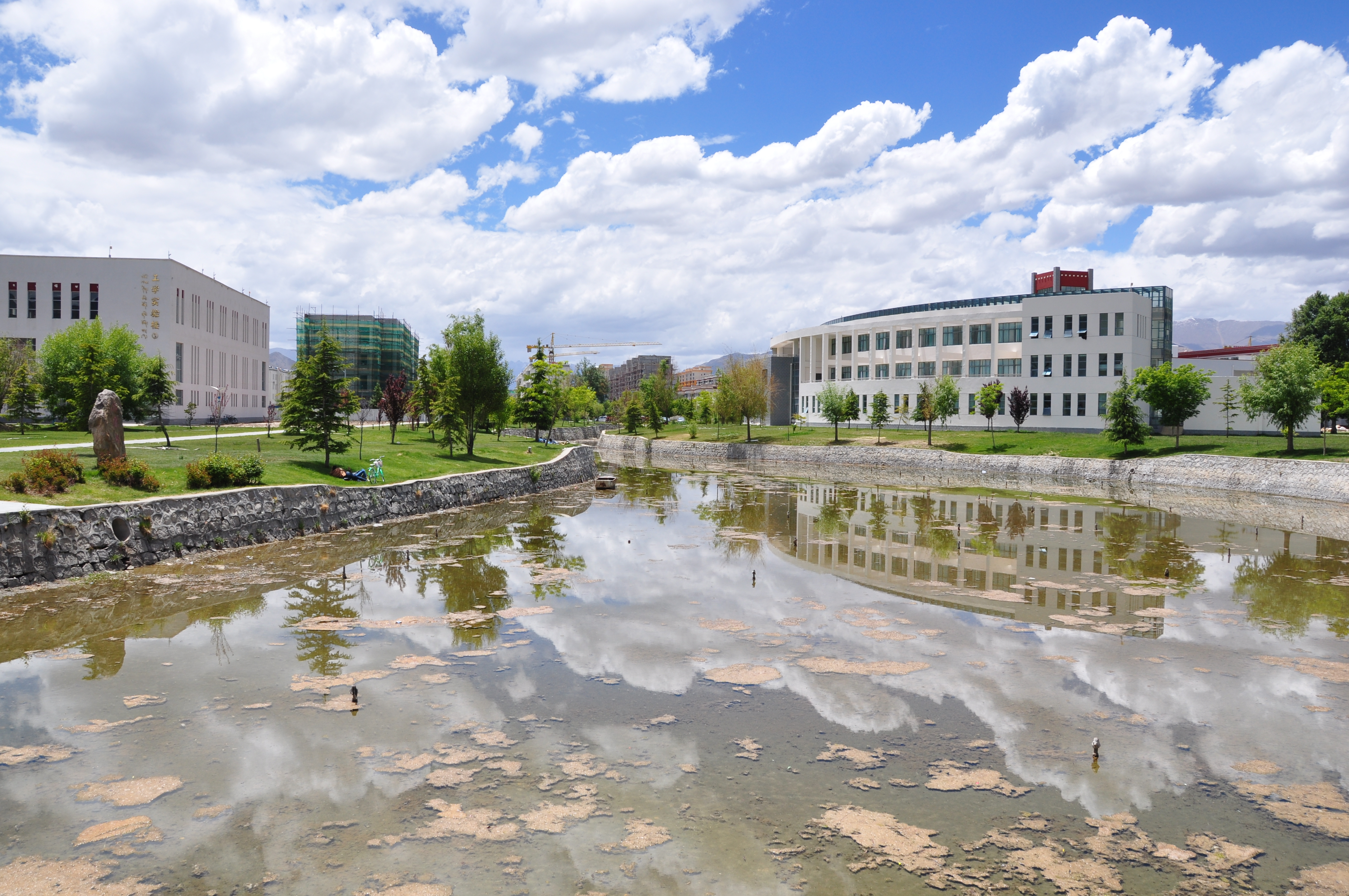
Tibet University Campus (2016)

There are two universities of Tibet University and Tibet Tibetan Medical University and 3 special colleges of Lhasa Teachers College, Tibet Police College and Tibet Vocational and Technical College in the Lhasa city.

Tibet University (Tibetan: བོད་ལྗོངས་སློབ་གྲྭ་ཆེན་མོ་) is the main university of Tibet Autonomous Region. Its campus is located in Chengguan District, Lhasa, east of the city-centre. A forerunner was created in 1952 and the university was officially established in 1985, funded by the Chinese government. About 8000 students are enrolled at the university. Tibet University is a comprehensive university with the highest academic level in Tibet Autonomous Region. It is a member of the prestigious Project 211, and is sponsored under the Double First-Class Construction initiative.

== Transport ==
=== Rail ===
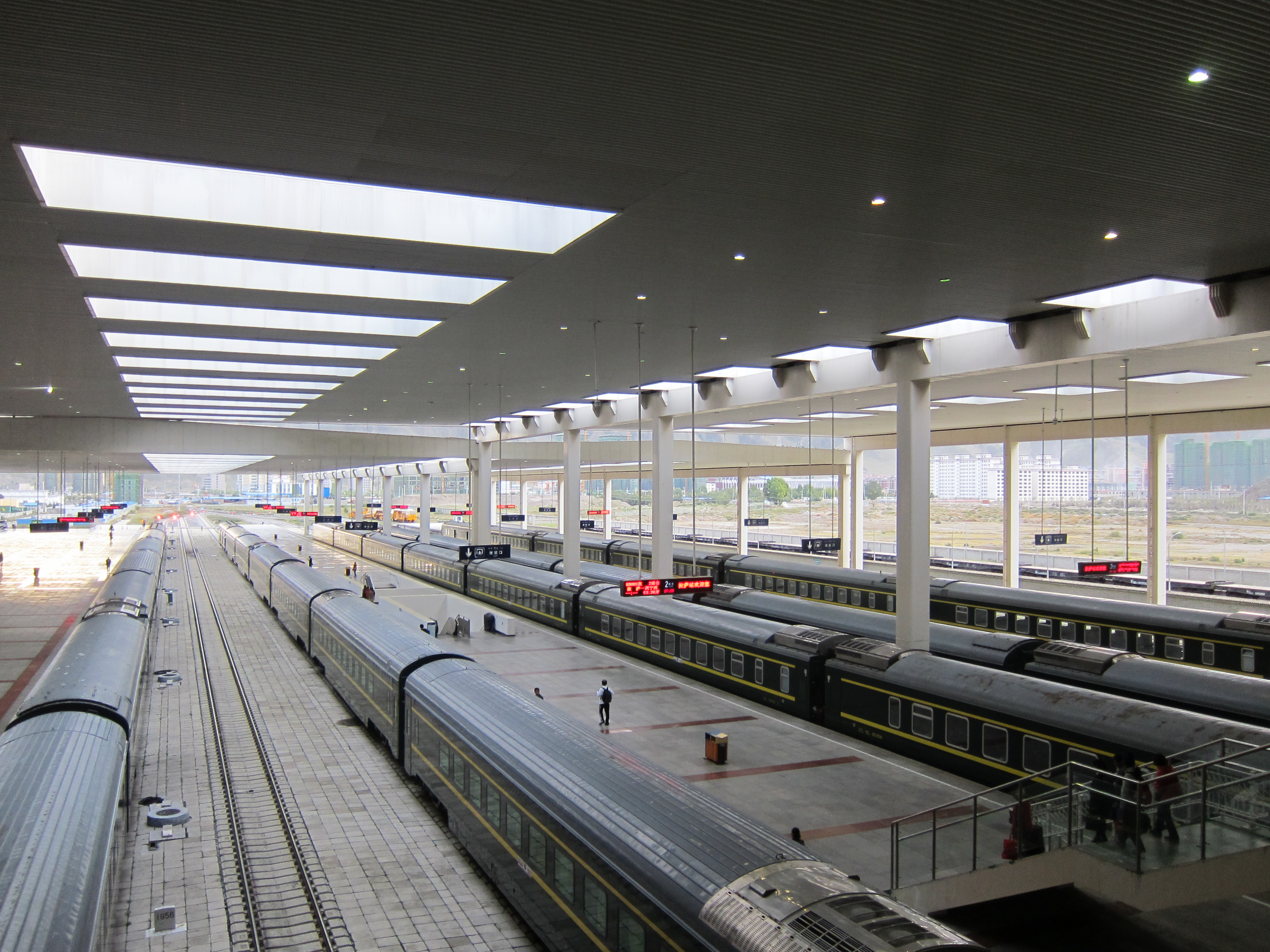
Lhasa railway station in 2019

Lhasa has been served by rail since 2006, when the Qinghai–Tibet Railway opened for passenger operations. Reaching an elevation of 5,072 metres above sea level, the Qinghai-Tibet railway is the world's highest railway by elevation. It connects Lhasa with Xining, the capital of Qinghai Province, some 2,000 km (1,200 mi) away, and ultimately links Lhasa with other major cities with China's extensive railway network. Five trains arrive at and depart from Lhasa railway station each day. Train number Z21 takes 40 hours and 53 minutes from Beijing West, arriving in Lhasa at 13:03 every day. Train Z22 from Lhasa to Beijing West departs at 15:30 and arrives in Beijing at 08:20 on the third day, taking 40 hours, 50 minutes. Trains also arrive in Lhasa from Chengdu, Chongqing, Lanzhou, Xining, Guangzhou, Shanghai and other cities. To counter the problem of altitude differences giving passengers altitude sickness, extra oxygen is pumped in through the ventilation system and available directly on each berth with close open control by a flap for the convenience of passengers, and personal oxygen masks are available on request. Within the soft sleeper cabins there are 64 seats per train, which have an electrical plug for electronics.

Lhasa is also connected to Shigatse, the second largest city in Tibet by rail service, since 2014. A third railway, the Sichuan–Tibet railway, which links Lhasa with Nyingchi County and into the interior ultimately terminating in Chengdu, began construction in June 2015.

For onward rail travel in South Asia, the closest major station in India is New Jalpaiguri, Siliguri in West Bengal. However, extension of the Indian railway system to Sikkim will make it easier for onward connections through the South Asian railway network. There are preliminary plans to link Lhasa by rail with Kathmandu.

As per a Chinese Tibetan spokesperson, extension of this rail line to Kathmandu with tunnelling under Mount Everest was, as of 2015, expected to be completed by 2020.

=== Air ===
Lhasa Gonggar Airport

Lhasa Gonggar International Airport (IATA: LXA), built in 1965, is the aviation hub of Tibet. It is located south of the city proper. It takes around half an hour to get there by car via the Lhasa Airport Expressway; prior to the completion of the expressway in 2011, the trip to the airport took over an hour. As of 2014, there are daily flights serving major Chinese cities including Beijing, Chengdu, Guangzhou, and Shanghai, and there are also occasional scheduled services to Kathmandu in Nepal. Lhasa Airport is the hub of Tibet Airlines, which offers regional services to other destinations in Tibet such as Nyingchi, Ngari Prefecture, Shigatse, and Qamdo.

=== Road ===
A busy road in central Lhasa

The Qinghai–Tibet Highway (part of G109) runs northeast toward Xining and eventually to Beijing and is the most-used road in Tibet. The Sichuan–Tibet Highway (part of G318) runs east towards Chengdu and eventually to Shanghai. G318 also runs west to Zhangmu on the Nepal border. The Xinjiang-Tibet Highway (G219) runs north from Lhasa to Yecheng, and then to Xinjiang. This road is rarely used due to the lack of amenities and petrol stations. A new 37.68 kilometres (23.41 mi), four-lane highway between Lhasa and the Gonggar Airport was built by the Transportation Department of Tibet at a cost of RMB 1.5 billion. This road is part of National Highway 318 and starts from the Lhasa railway station, passes through Caina Township in Qushui County, terminating between the north entrance of the Gala Mountain Tunnel and the south bridgehead of the Lhasa River Bridge, and en route goes over the first overpass of Lhasa at Liuwu Overpass.

=== Maritime ===
The closest seaports are Kolkata and Haldia in West Bengal, India. The Nathu La pass offers Chinese companies access to the port of Kolkata (Calcutta), situated about 1,100 km (680 mi) from Lhasa, for trans-shipments to and from Tibet.

== Sports ==
In 2014, the Lhasa Mass Culture and Sports Center (拉萨市群众文化体育中心) was completed in Liwu New District of Lhasa City. The center was built with the assistance of Beijing Municipality, which is the highest modern stadium in the world, the largest single building in Tibet and the largest modern building invested by the whole country in support of Tibet, and has won the Luban Prize, the highest honor in China's construction industry, and has been called the "Little Bird's Nest" by local people.

== See also ==
- Drapchi Prison or Lhasa Prison No.1
- McLeod Ganj
- The Lhasa Atlas
- Leh, India
- List of twin towns and sister cities in China
- Mustang, Nepal
