= Barkhor =

Commercial center and busiest street of the old city of Lhasa, Tibet

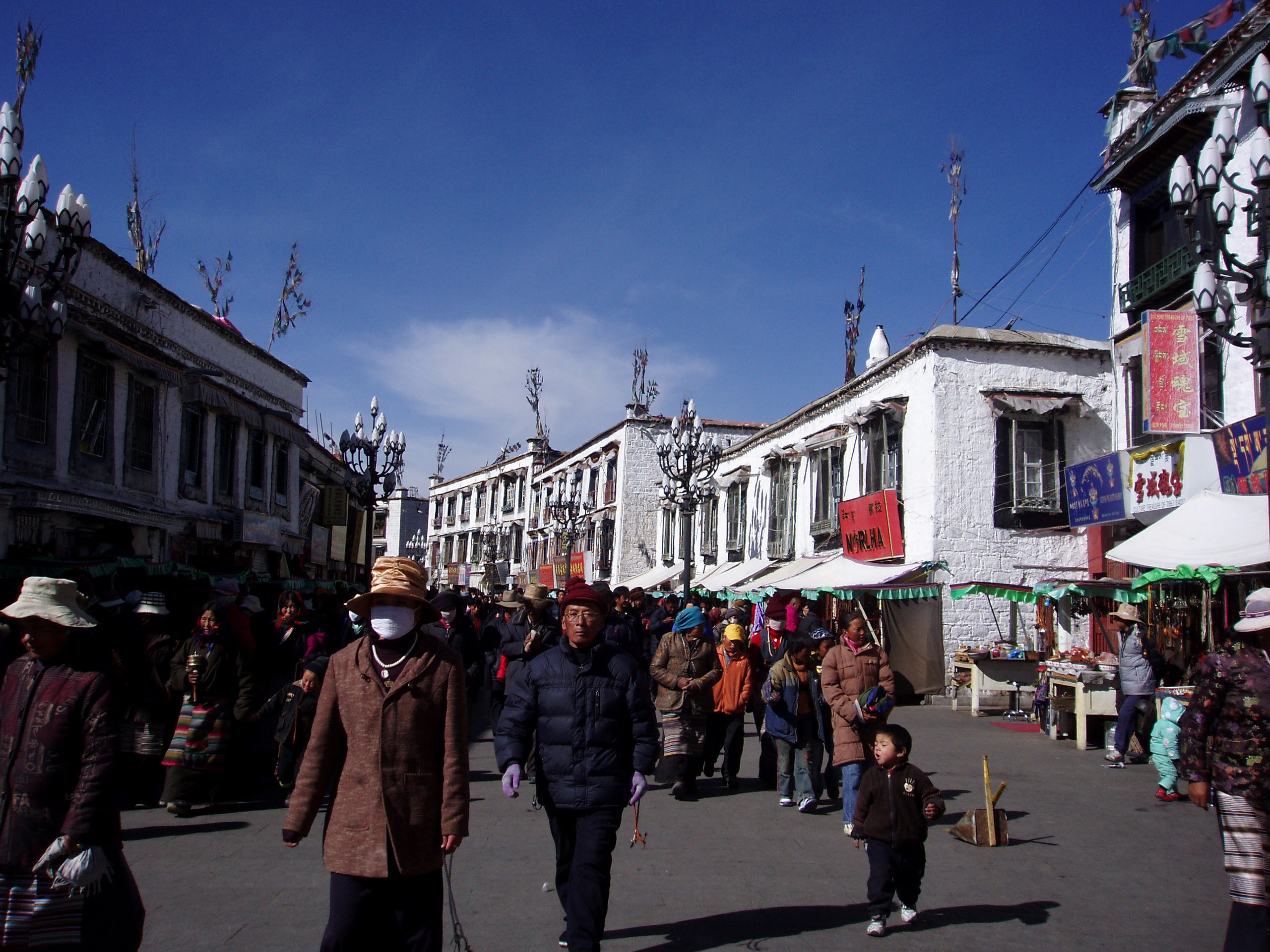
Barkhor in Winter

Barkhor (Tibetan: བར་སྐོར་, Wylie: bar-skor), is the commercial center and busiest street of the old city of Lhasa, Tibet. The Barkhor Ring Road is composed of Barkhor East Street, Barkhor South Street, Barkhor West Street and Barkhor North Street. The circumference of Barkhor Street is about 1,000 meters, originated in the 7th century A.D., better preserving the original style of the old city of Lhasa.

Barkhor is the oldest street in Lhasa, the ancient Songtsen Gampo and Princess Wencheng led the migration to Lhasa, first built the Jokhang, where Tibetan Buddhism believers began to turn around the monastery, and gradually formed a road, became one of the three turnstiles of Lhasa in the turnstiles (the other two are Lingkhor and Woesor), the Tibetans call the Barkhor "holy road".

Barkhor is a one-way street, walking on the eight silhouette, must be and the rotating direction of the cylinder, that is, clockwise walking (right around), there are many believers in the street in a step a long kneeling to turn the scriptures.

== See also ==
- Pargor Subdistrict
