= Lingkhor =

Sacred path in Lhasa, Tibet, China

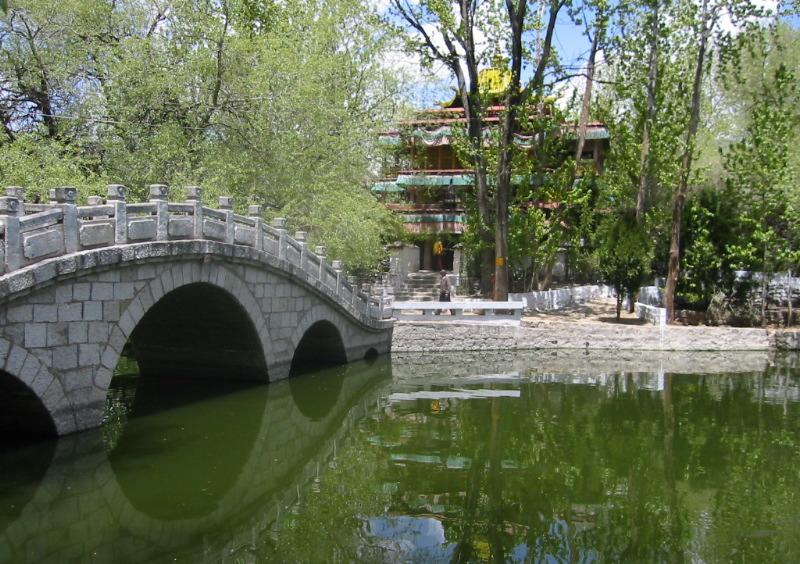
The path led past the Potala to a pond.

The Lingkhor (Chinese: 外廓) is a sacred path, the most common name of the outer pilgrim circumambulation path in Lhasa.
