= China Tibetology Research Center =

Academic research organization in Beijing, China

- 中国藏学研究中心
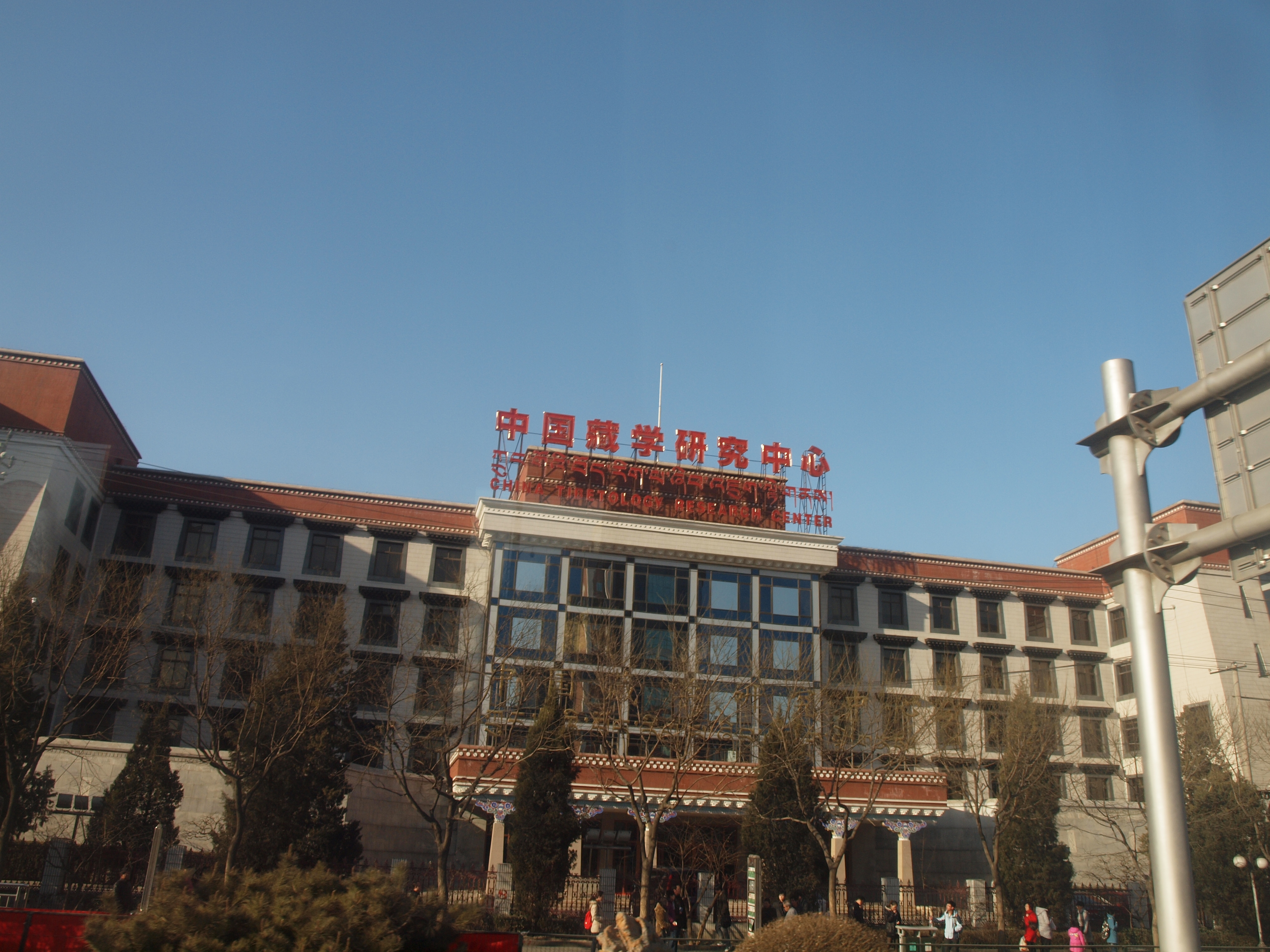
- China Tibetology Research Center headquarters in Beijing
- Formation: May 20, 1986; 40 years ago
- Type: Research institute
- Headquarters: Beijing
- Website: www.tibetology.ac.cn

The China Tibetology Research Center (Chinese: 中国藏学研究中心; Tibetan: ཀྲུང་གོའི་བོད་རིག་པ་ཞིབ་འཇུག་ལྟེ་གནས།; Wylie: Krung go'i bod rig pa zhib 'jug lte gnas) is a research institute in Beijing, China devoted to the study of Tibet (Tibetology).

== Founding ==
The China Tibetology Research Center was founded in Beijing on May 20, 1986. CTRC is administered by a Director General's Council composed of the Director General and the Deputy Director General. The Academic Council is an academic advisory and deliberation body. The operational departments carry out academic research and other work mainly through undertaking projects. The Center hosts the National Beijing Seminar on Tibetology, the Everest Forum on Tibetology, as well as the selection of the Everest Prize for China's Tibetology, the Coordination Meeting for Tibetan Studies, and other activities. The Center also edits and publishes the China Tibetology Yearbook and the China Tibetology (Chinese: 《中国藏学》) magazine, and runs the China Tibetology website.

== Subdivisions ==
Five research institutes comprise the scholarly core of the Chinese Tibetology Research Center. They are:

- Institute for Social and Economic Studies
- Institute for History Studies
- Institute for Religious Studies
- Institute for Contemporary Tibetan Studies
- Institute for Tibetan Medicine Studies.

Additionally, the Center also manages the China Tibetology Publishing House, the Kanjur and Tanjur Collation Bureau, the Beijing Tibetan Medical Center, and the Museum of Tibetan Culture.

== Activities ==
International collaboration and academic exchange are key activities of the CTRC. The Center has held three international seminars for Tibetan studies. In 2001, about 220 scholars from 14 countries attended the Beijing International Seminar for Tibetan Studies. Since the year 2000, the Center has hosted about 230 scholars, diplomats and journalists from 40 countries. The 7th Beijing International Symposium on Tibetan Studies, co-organized by the China Association for the Protection and Development of Tibetan Culture, the China Tibetology Research Center, and the Tibet Autonomous Region Academy of Social Sciences, opened on August 14, 2023, in Beijing. The event, themed "Prosperous Development of Tibetan Studies and an Open Tibet," brought together 320 scholars from China and abroad. The event was criticized by the Central Tibetan Administration as Chinese government propaganda.

In 2009, the U.S. Congressional-Executive Commission on China suggested that the secretary of the Chinese Communist Party group in CTRC at the time was a former official of the United Front Work Department of the party.

== See also ==
- Museum of Tibetan Culture
- Tibet Museum (Lhasa)
- Lhasa Mass Culture and Sports Center
- Memorial Hall Marking the Emancipation of More Than One Million Serfs
