= Tibet Exhibition Center =

Exhibition center in Lhasa, Tibet, China

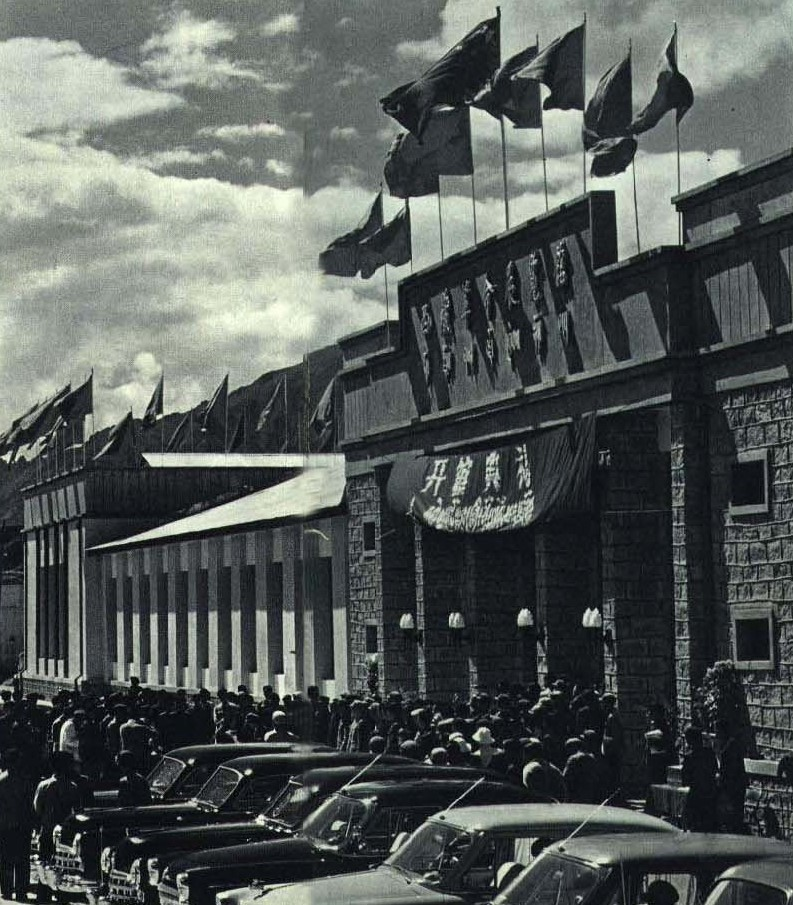
Tibet Revolutionary Exhibition Hall in 1965

The Tibet Exhibition Center (Chinese: 西藏展览中心) is an exhibition center in Lhasa, Tibet Autonomous Region, China, located at No. 17, Norbulingka Road, Lhasa. The exhibition center is under the Department of Culture of the Tibet Autonomous Region.

== History ==
The predecessor of the Tibet Exhibition Center was the Tibet Revolutionary Exhibition Hall, which was built in 1965 on the east side of the Potala Palace at the suggestion of Vice Premier Chen Yi, with the name of the hall, "Tibet Revolutionary Exhibition Hall", inscribed by the Chairman of the Standing Committee of the National People's Congress, Zhu De.

In 1965, the Tibet Revolutionary Exhibition Hall was formally established, and on August 25, 1965, the hall held an opening ceremony, and for the first time held a large-scale exhibition reflecting the achievements of the revolution and construction of Tibet in the past fifteen years. Later, the museum was renamed as Tibet Exhibition Hall.

In 1985, the "International Traveling Exhibition of Lawson Park's Works" by the American painter Robert Rauschenberg was held in the Tibet Exhibition Hall, and in 1989, the "Ten-Year Achievement Exhibition of Tibetan Literature and Art" was held in the Tibet Exhibition Hall. In 1994, due to the overall reconstruction of the Potala Palace Square, the building in front of the Potala Palace was demolished. In August 1996, the building was renamed as the Tibet Exhibition Center.
