= Treasure of the Plateau =

Sculpture in Lhasa, Tibet, China

Coordinates: 29°39′20″N 91°06′34″E

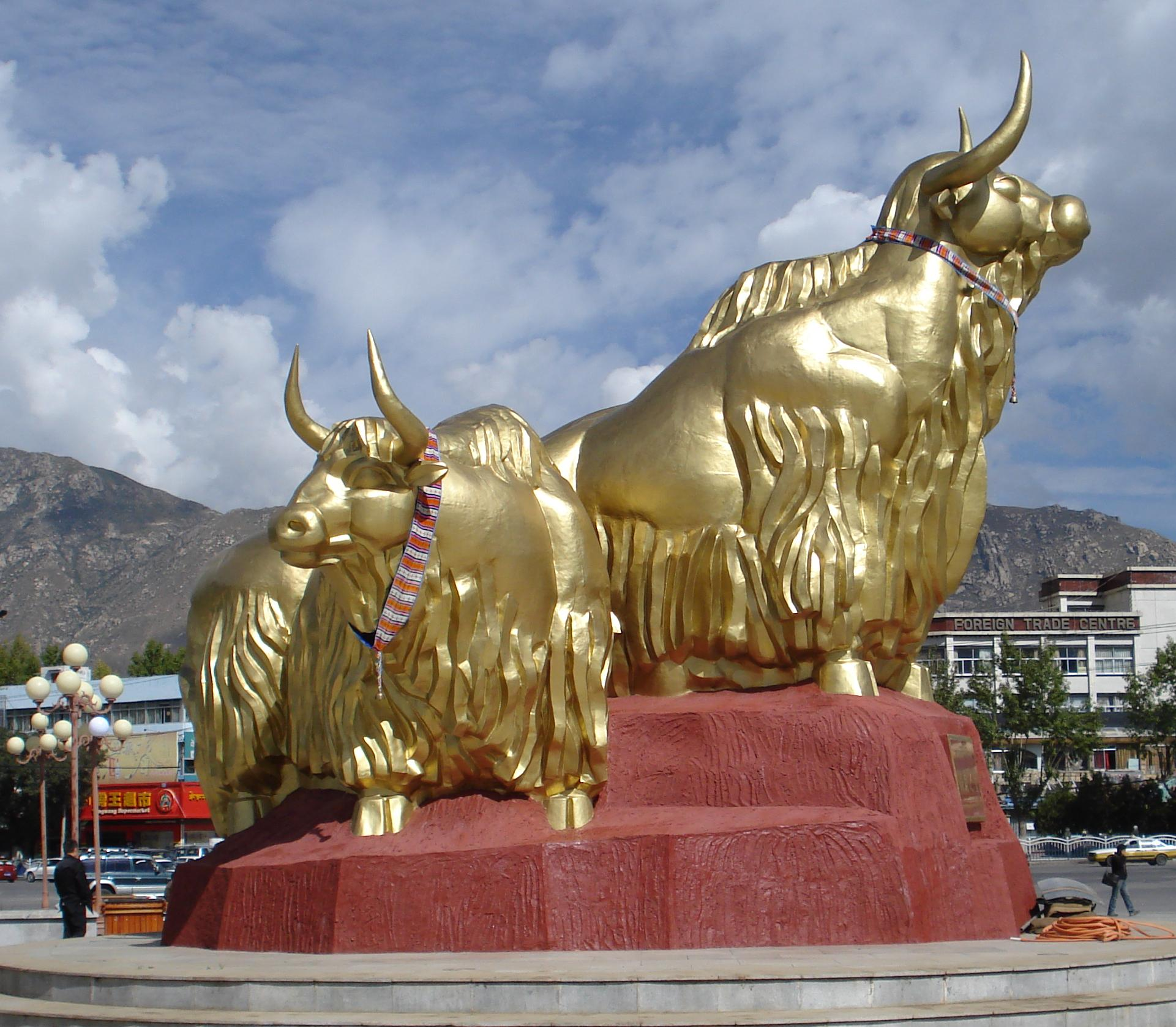
The Treasure of the Highlands on Beijing Central Road

The Treasure of the Plateau (Chinese: 高原之宝) is an urban sculpture in Lhasa, Tibet Autonomous Region, China.

== History ==
The sculpture was designed by Zheng Xiaodong (later a professor at the School of Broadcasting, Film and Television of Chengdu University of Science and Technology) and was erected on May 2, 1991, at the intersection of Beijing Middle Road, North Linkor Road and Norbulingka Road, and then in 2008 was moved to the under-construction Chagpori Park. The sculpture is a pair of yaks made of 2 tons of copper, shining in the sunlight.
