= Chagpori Park =

Park in Lhasa, Tibet, China

Coordinates: 29°39′20″N 91°06′36″E

Chagpori Park (Chinese: 药王山公园), located in Chengguan District, Lhasa, Tibet Autonomous Region, China.

== History ==
Chagpori Park is located at the foot of the north side of Chagpori. The park is triangular in plan, between the south side and the Chagpori for the Norbulingka Road, the northwest side for the Linkor West Road, the northeast side for the Beijing Middle Road.

The park was very small. in 2008, on the basis of the original "east to build", that is, remodeling the original small park, and will be small park on the west side of the house demolition, expanding for the western part of the park. In June 2008, the chagpori park renovation and expansion project is basically completed. After this reconstruction and expansion, the area of Chagpori Park reached 23,600 square meters. The water from the central canal was introduced to the south side of the park through a culvert; in the center of the park is a large square with a sculpture of the Treasure of the Plateau, which was relocated from the Beijing Middle Road in 2008. New tree species transplanted from outside the area decorate the park.
