= Museum of Tibetan Culture =

Museum in Datun, Chaoyang, Beijing, China

Coordinates: 39.9879°N 116.4081°E

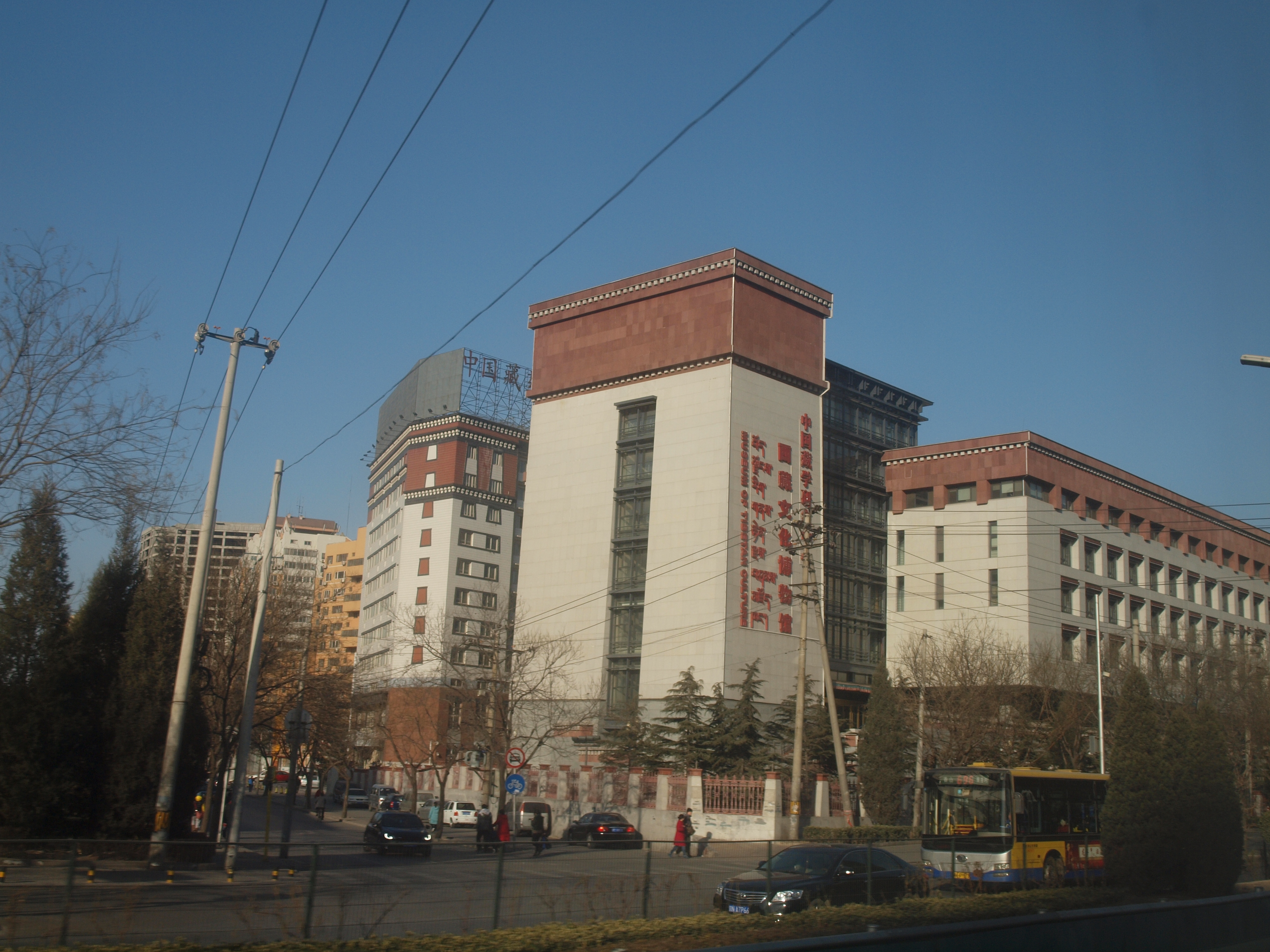
Museum of Tibetan Culture

The Museum of Tibetan Culture (Chinese: 西藏文化博物馆), or Tibet Cultural Museum is a museum in northern Beijing. It has exhibits on Tibetan culture and features artwork about their history. The China Tibetology Research Center began building the museum in 2007 and opened it on 28 March 2010.

== See also ==
- China Tibetology Research Center
- Tibet Museum
