= Memorial Hall Marking the Emancipation of More Than One Million Serfs =

Museum in Lhasa, Tibet, China

Coordinates: 29.65108°N 91.09728°E

The Memorial Hall Marking the Emancipation of More Than One Million Serfs in Tibet (Chinese: 西藏百万农奴解放纪念馆) is a museum located in Lhasa, Tibet Autonomous Region, and is China's first abolitionist movement-themed memorial hall.

== History ==
Construction began on November 5, 2018, and opened on March 28, 2019. Located in the Old Hall of the Tibet Museum at No. 2, South Minzu Road, Chengguan District, Lhasa, it is a permanent hall of the Tibet Museum, adjacent to the Tibet Museum of Natural Science. Officially established in January 2009 to mark the anniversary of the Emancipation of More Than One Million Serfs in Tibet on March 28 each year, the memorial hall occupies a site area of 2,700 square meters, with an exhibition area of about 3,500 square meters and six exhibition halls.

== See also ==
- Serfs' Emancipation Day
