= Potala Palace Square =

Square in Lhasa, Tibet, China

Coordinates: 29.65433°N 91.11707°E

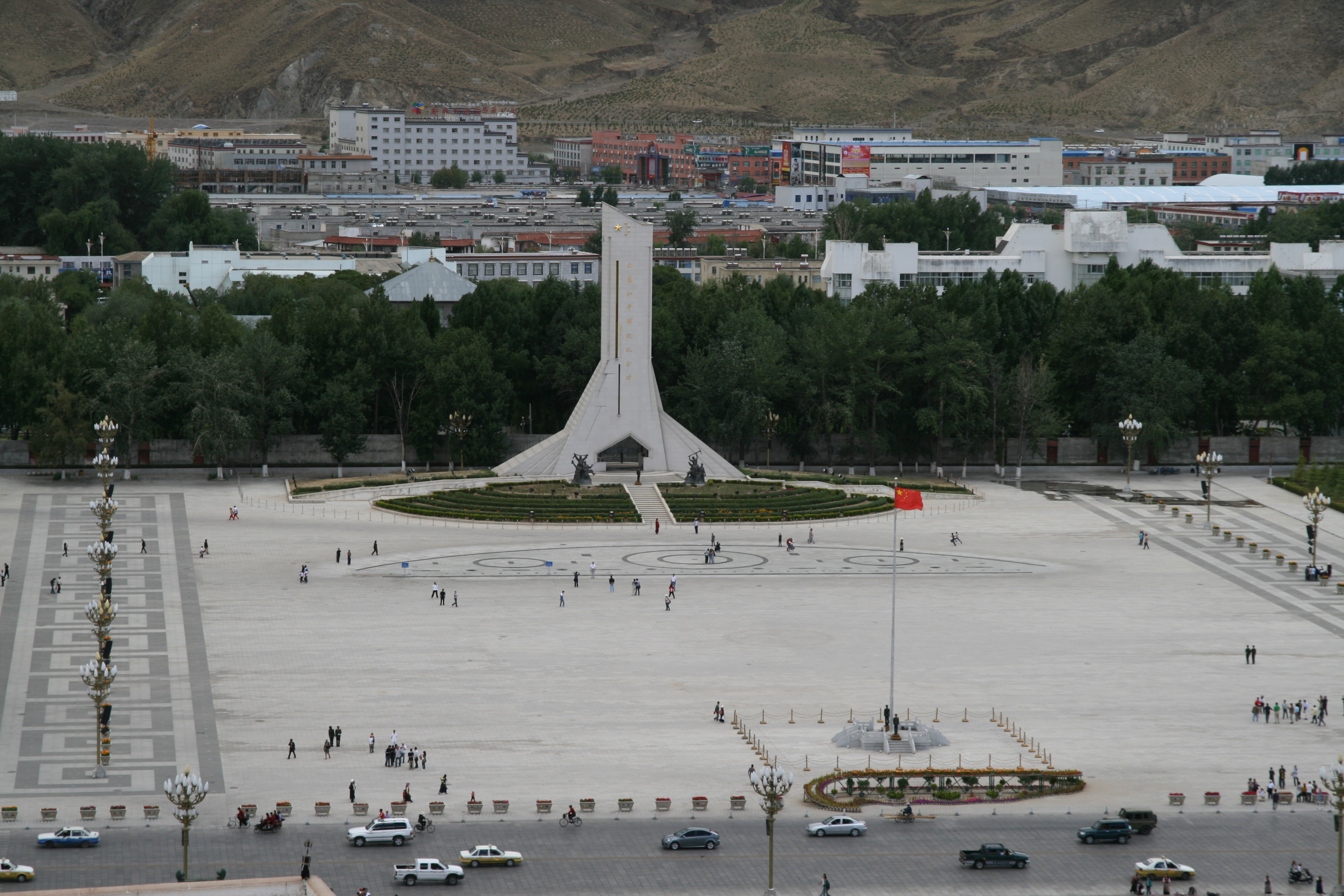
A view of Potala Palace Square from the Potala Palace, with the National Flag Stand to the north and the Monument to the Peaceful Liberation of Tibet to the south.

Potala Palace Square (Chinese: 布达拉宫广场) is a large square in the center of Lhasa, Tibet Autonomous Region, China, located in the south side of the Potala Palace, formerly known as the Working People's Cultural Palace Square (Chinese: 劳动人民文化宫广场). In 1995, the Potala Palace Square was built on the basis of the original Tibetan Working People's Cultural Palace Square, and in August 1995, the Potala Palace Square was handed over to the management of the Tibetan Working People's Cultural Palace. The Potala Palace Square was rebuilt and expanded in 2005.

The north side of the Dala Palace Square is Beijing Middle Road, and the north side of the road is the Potala Palace. Square on the north side of the flag of the People's Republic of China flag stand, the south side of the Monument to the Peaceful Liberation of Tibet and the People's Government of Tibet Autonomous Region compound. There are six Chinese lamps on each side of the square. The east and west sides of the square are large green areas, and there is an artificial lake on the east side.

== Maintenance ==
According to historical records, in 1961, Potala Palace was included in the first batch of national key cultural relics protection units. Since then, the Potala Palace has been repaired and maintained every year, commonly known as "suixiu". The first overall renovation of Potala Palace was carried out in 1984, when the Potala Palace Qiangba Hall caught fire due to the aging of the circuit, and the National Cultural Heritage Administration quickly sent ancient architecture experts and related personnel.

== Geographical location and basic characteristics ==
The Potala Palace Square is located in the central area of Lhasa, Tibet Autonomous Region. It is adjacent to the Potala Palace in the north and the Tibet Workers' Cultural Palace in the south. It stretches about 600 meters from east to west and about 400 meters from north to south. It has a total area of 18,000 square meters.

== Construction and development history ==
=== Initial construction ===
The construction of the square began in 1994 and is one of the key infrastructures planned by the Tibet Autonomous Region . The entire project cost 113 million yuan and was completed in less than a year. It was officially opened in 1995, marking a new starting point for Lhasa to move towards modern urban planning.

=== Expansion and renovation ===
In 2005, the Potala Palace Square was expanded and optimized on a large scale. The scope of the expansion of the Potala Palace Square was to expand from the central axis of the national flag in the square to the west to the foot of Yaowang Mountain. The total area is about 15.5 hectares, with a total investment of 150 million yuan. The renovation and expansion project mainly involves the transformation of the garden landscape in the east area of the square, the expansion of the central square, the construction of new garden landscape and roads in the west area, the construction of a new artificial lake, the White Pagoda Square, the small square, the music fountain square, the sculpture square and the cultural relief wall. After the expansion, the square area increased from the original 110,000 square meters to 180,000 square meters, and the newly added green lawn of nearly 70,000 square meters uses an automatic sprinkler system.

In order to preserve the historical relics in the square, the renovation project adopted the approach of "restoring the old as it was". For example, the original location of the Lhasa Zhol Pillar was retained, while the surrounding environment was beautified. The White Pagoda Square was newly built around the White Pagoda to create a more prominent visual effect.

Over the years, the water system around the Potala Palace has had problems such as sludge accumulation and pipe blockage that affect the landscape and water quality. In 2020, the water system around the Potala Palace was repaired and renovated again. The water system renovation project around the Potala Palace is to divert water from the main canal at the intersection of Niangre Road and Dangre Road to supply Longwangtan Park, the Potala Palace Square Pool, the Panchen Lama Courtyard, the Tongniu Park, and the Norbulingka. The total length of the project is about 10.9 kilometers. Among them, 2,121 square meters of new water system were built. The renovation project mainly includes water system connection project, sewage interception project, revetment repair project, landscape improvement and water ecological restoration project, dredging project, anti-seepage project, greening project, smart water project, irrigation project and other ancillary projects.

=== Highlights and Innovations ===
One of the highlights of the renovation of the Potala Palace Square is the reconstruction of the water system . The water system draws water from Longwangtan to the eastern lake area, then to the western water system through clean water pipes, and then flows to the artificial lake of the Panchen Lama's small building. In this way, the entire water system forms a good active circulation system. The entire water system forms a good active circulation system. The active water circulation is realized, making the square environment more fresh and natural. At the same time, the newly added relief wall has become one of the cultural symbols of the square. The reliefs were designed by the Xi'an Academy of Fine Arts and have a total of 13 pieces. The main relief in the middle is 90 meters long and shows the past, present and future of Tibet, as well as the scenes of Tibet's culture, religion, ethnicity, life and other aspects. The pictures are lifelike and magnificent, telling the past and future of Tibet with a magnificent historical picture scroll.

== Special landscape and functions ==
The Potala Palace Square has its own charm both during the day and at night. During the day, the dancing white doves add a lively atmosphere to the crowd. At night, the musical fountain of the Potala Palace Square is a popular tourist attraction in Lhasa. Accompanied by melodious music, various forms of water spray and colorful lighting effects, the water sprays up and down to form a colorful curtain of water, sometimes rushing straight into the sky, sometimes turning into a lotus shape, outlining a bizarre and magnificent Potala Palace at night. Accompanied by classic music of Tibet, the square is transformed into a vibrant performance venue.

At the south end of the square stands the Monument to the Peaceful Liberation of Tibet. The monument is 37 meters high. Its main body is gray and white, and its shape is an abstract Mount Everest. Its tall shape reveals a towering momentum and an eternal existence with heaven and earth. The monument was built in 2001 to commemorate the 50th anniversary of the Annexation of Tibet by the People's Republic of China. The name of the monument was written by Jiang Zemin, then General Secretary of the Chinese Communist Party. Hu Jintao, then a member of the Politburo Standing Committee of the Chinese Communist Party and Vice President of the State, personally attended the groundbreaking ceremony on July 18, 2001.

== Gallery ==
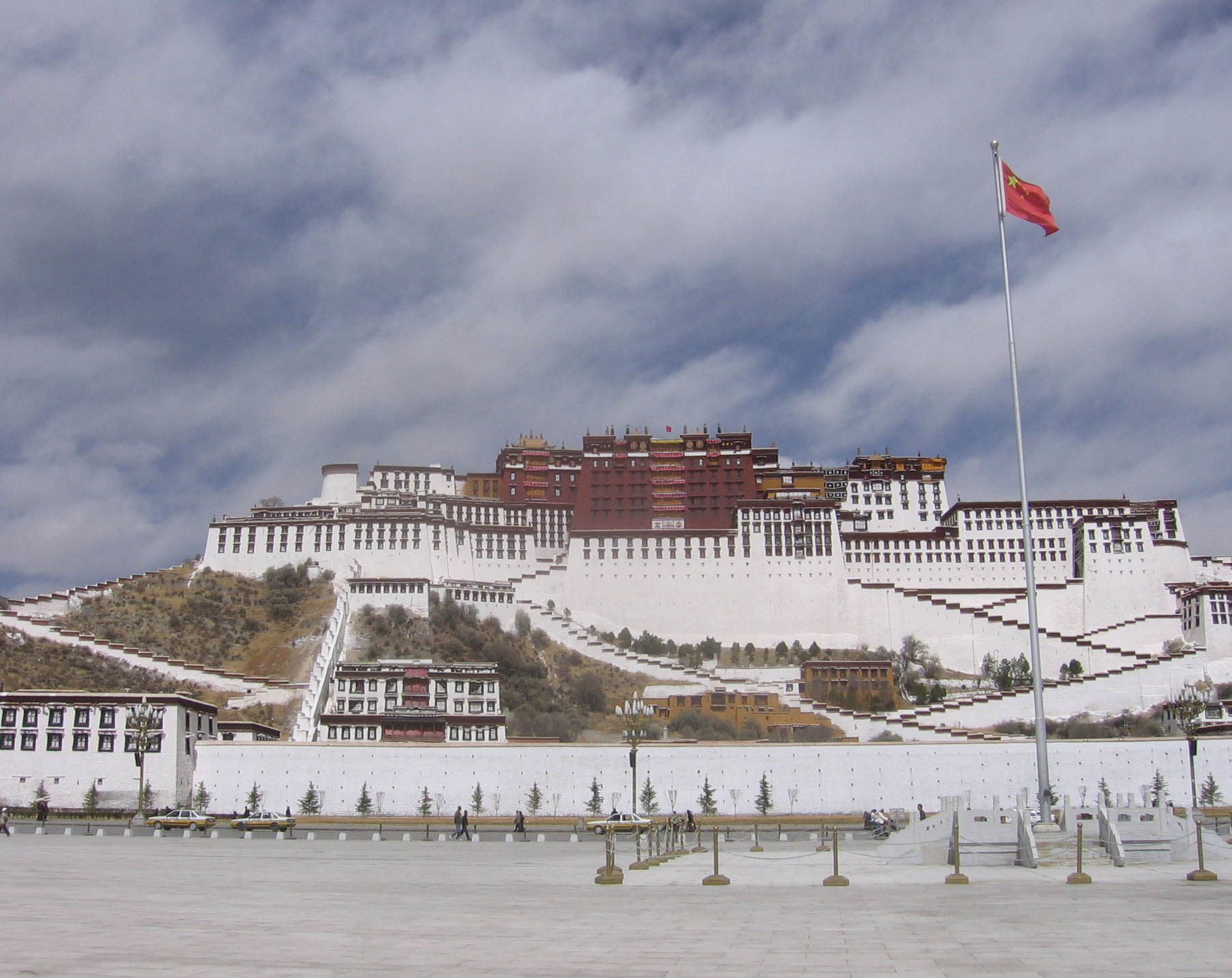
Potala Palace from the square

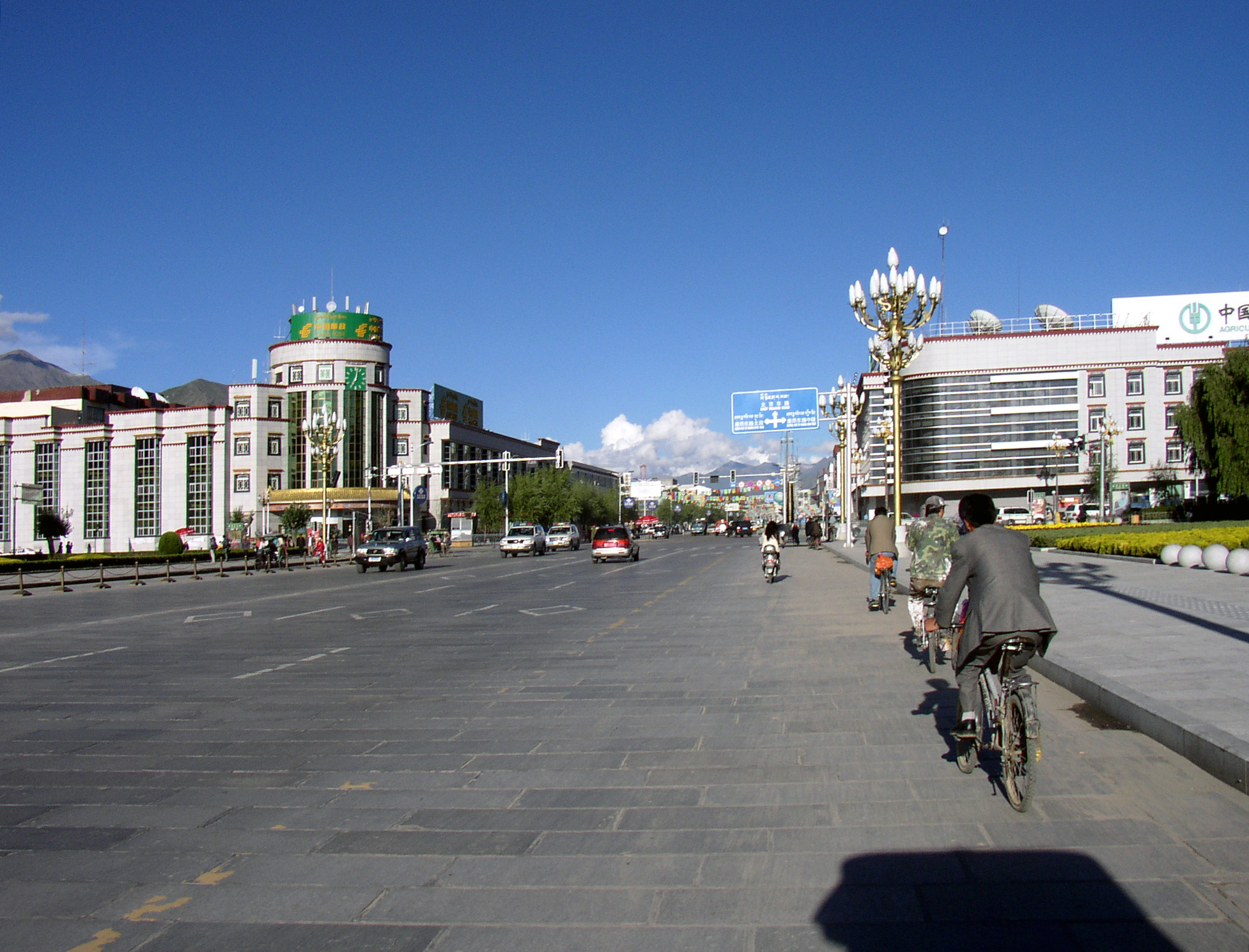
Potala Palace at the foot of Beijing Middle Road

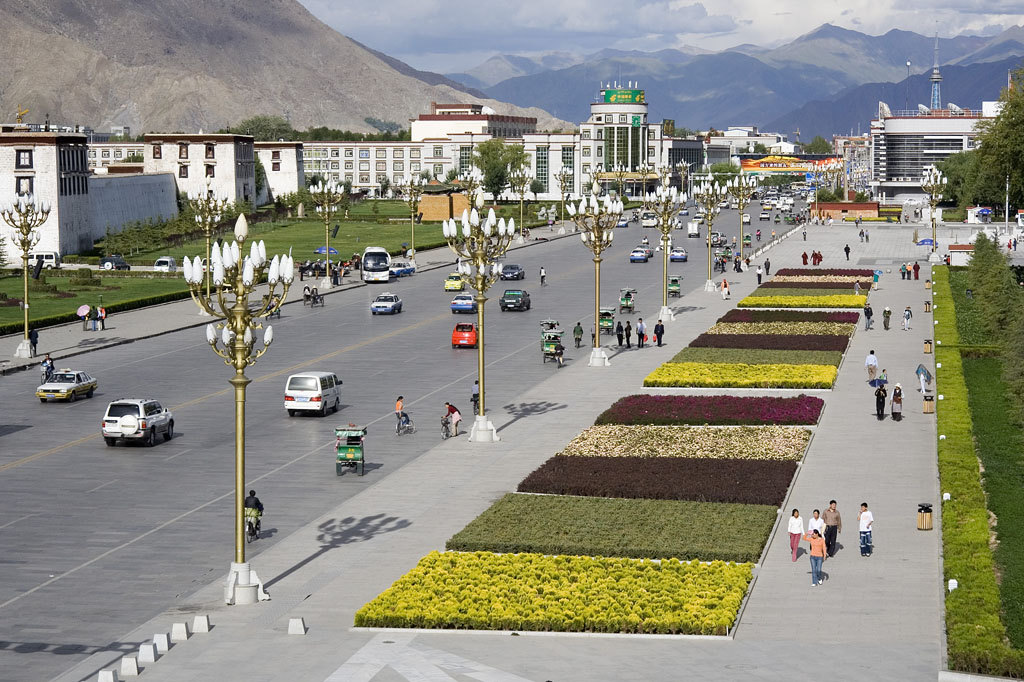
Potala Palace at the foot of Beijing Middle Road

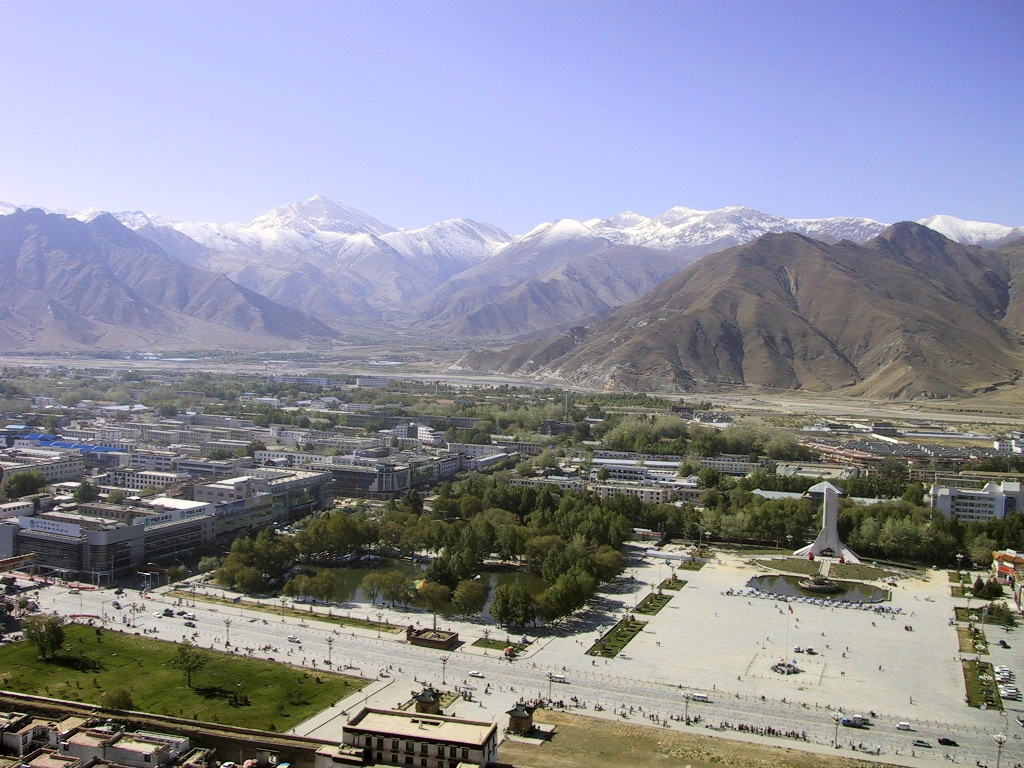
View from the Potala Palace Square, the left side of the picture for the square on the east side of the artificial lake

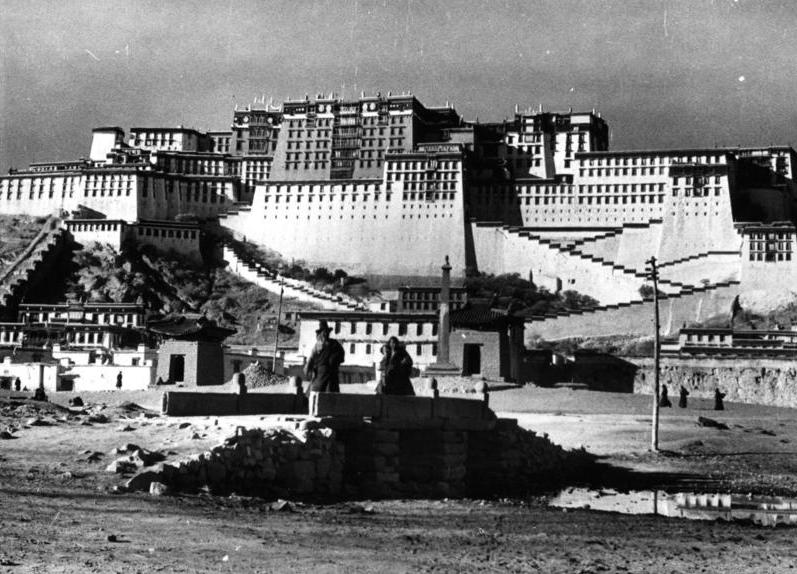
The south side of the Potala Palace from 1938 to 1939, when there was no square.

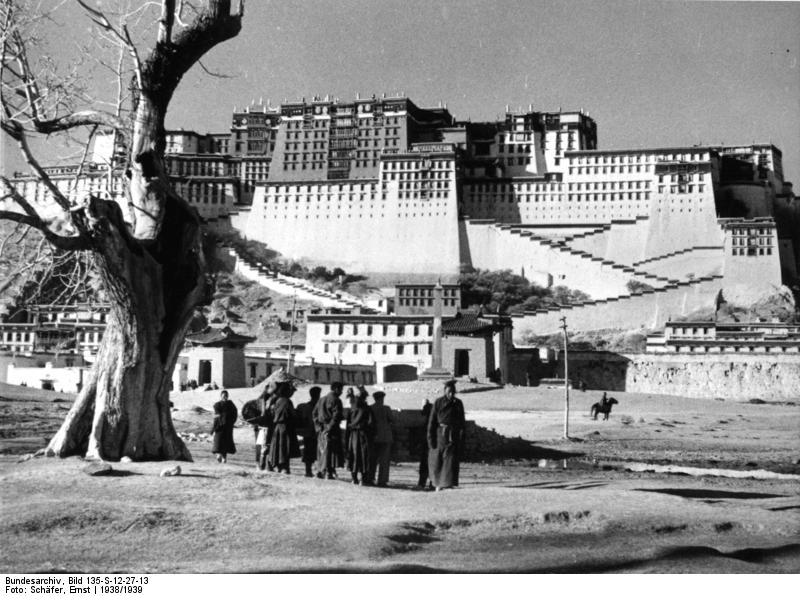
The south side of the Potala Palace from 1938 to 1939

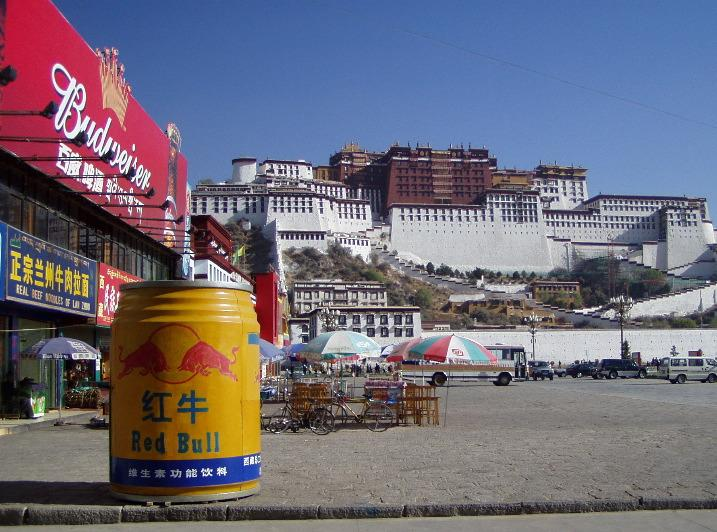
Red Bull Energy Drink advertising model on the west side of the Potala Palace Square in 2004.

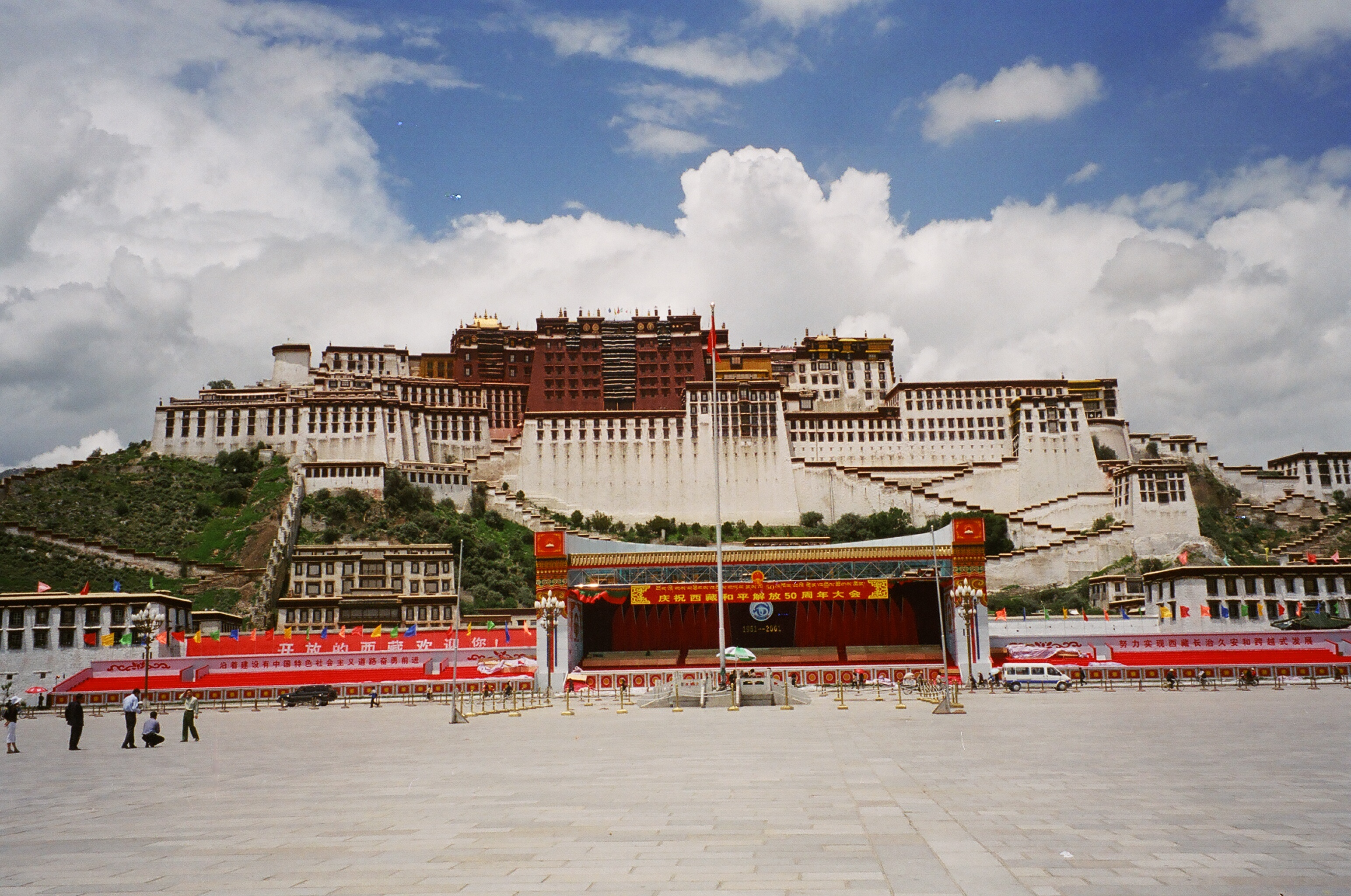
The venue of the conference held on the square in 2001 to celebrate the 50th anniversary of the peaceful liberation of Tibet.

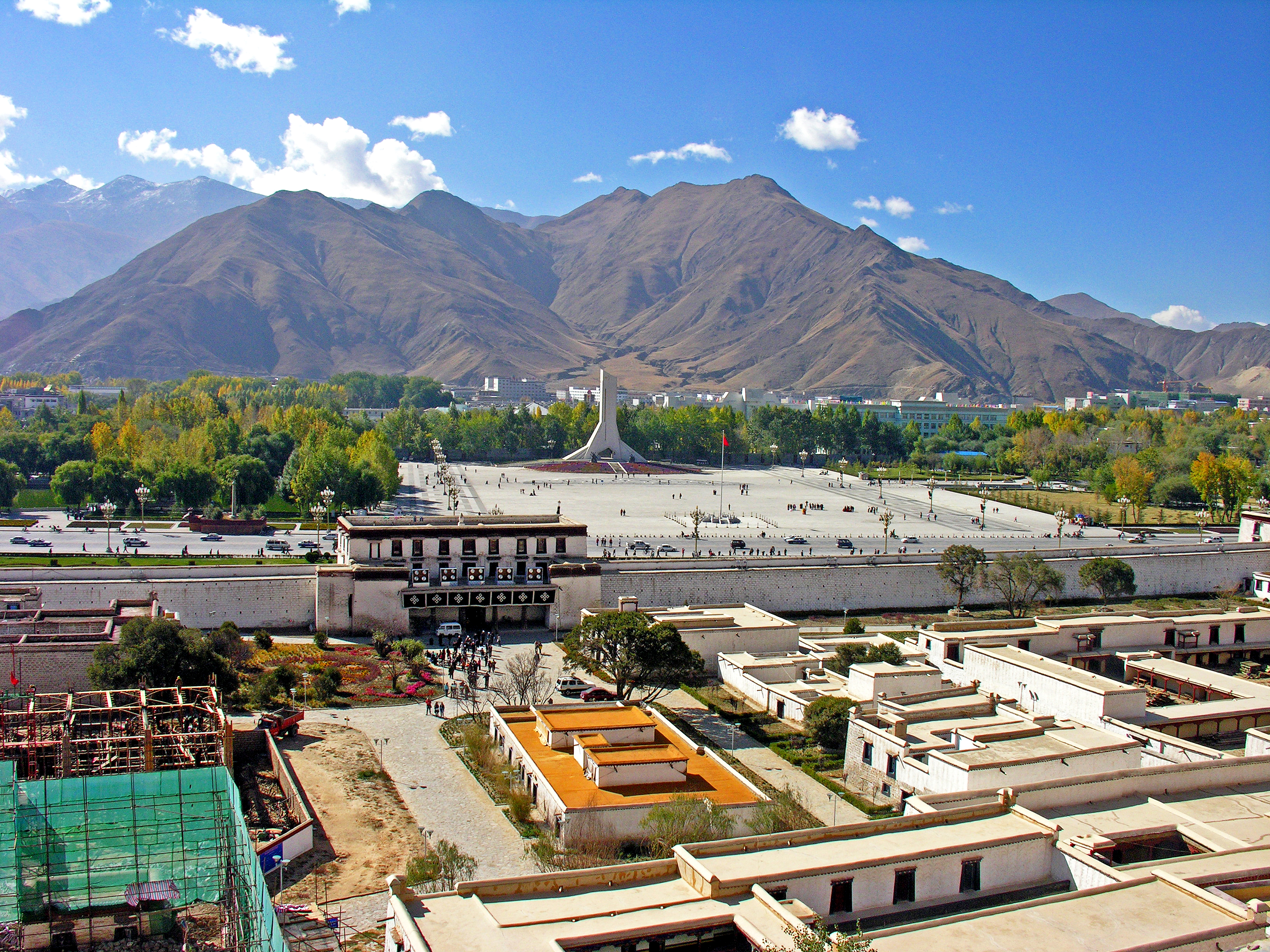
View of the square from the Potala Palace, with Zhol Village at the bottom of the picture.

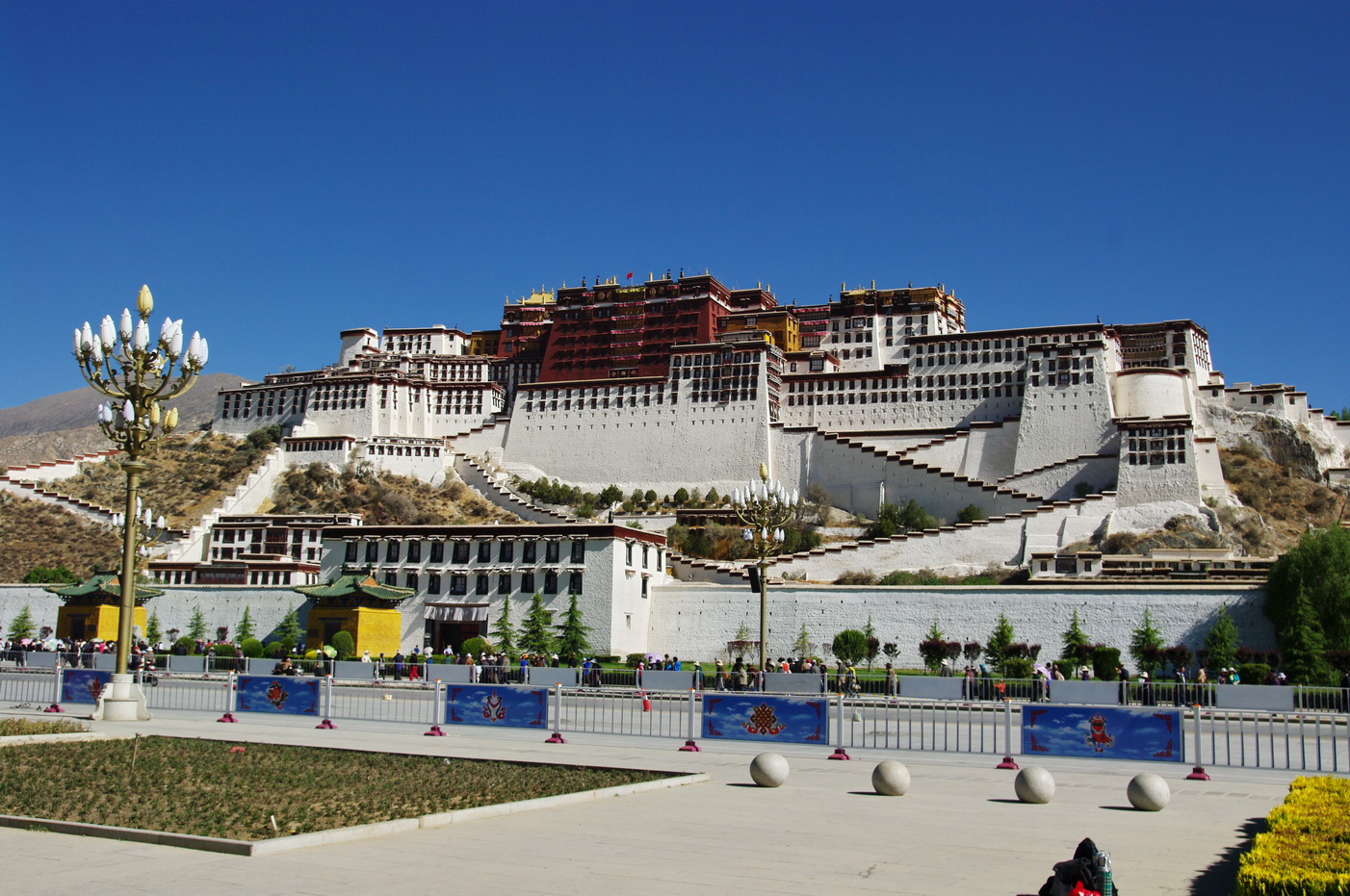
Potala Palace from the square
