= Tibet Working People's Cultural Palace =

Coordinates: 29.64784°N 91.15784°E

The Tibet Working People's Cultural Palace (Chinese: 西藏劳动人民文化宫), or Cultural Palace of the Tibetan Working People was a famous original building in Lhasa, Tibet Autonomous Region, China, belonging to the Tibet Autonomous Region Federation of Trade Unions, located on the south side of the Potala Palace Square, which has now been demolished.

== History ==
In May 1965, the building was invested and constructed by the Tibet Autonomous Region General Confederation of Trade Unions, and on August 30, 1965, it was completed. Zhu De's handwriting "Working People's Cultural Palace" hanging above the main door.

From September 1 to September 9, 1965, the first session of the first TAR People's Congress was held here, and on September 9, 1965, Ngapoi Ngawang Jigme, the newly elected chairman of the first TAR People's Committee, declared the formal establishment of the Tibet Autonomous Region.

In 1995, the Potala Palace Square was constructed on the basis of the original square of the Cultural Palace of the Working People, and in August 1995, the Potala Palace Square was handed over to the management of the Cultural Palace of the Working People. In 2004, the building was demolished.
