= Monument to the Peaceful Liberation of Tibet =

Monument in Lhasa, Tibet, China

Coordinates: 29°39′11″N 91°07′02″E

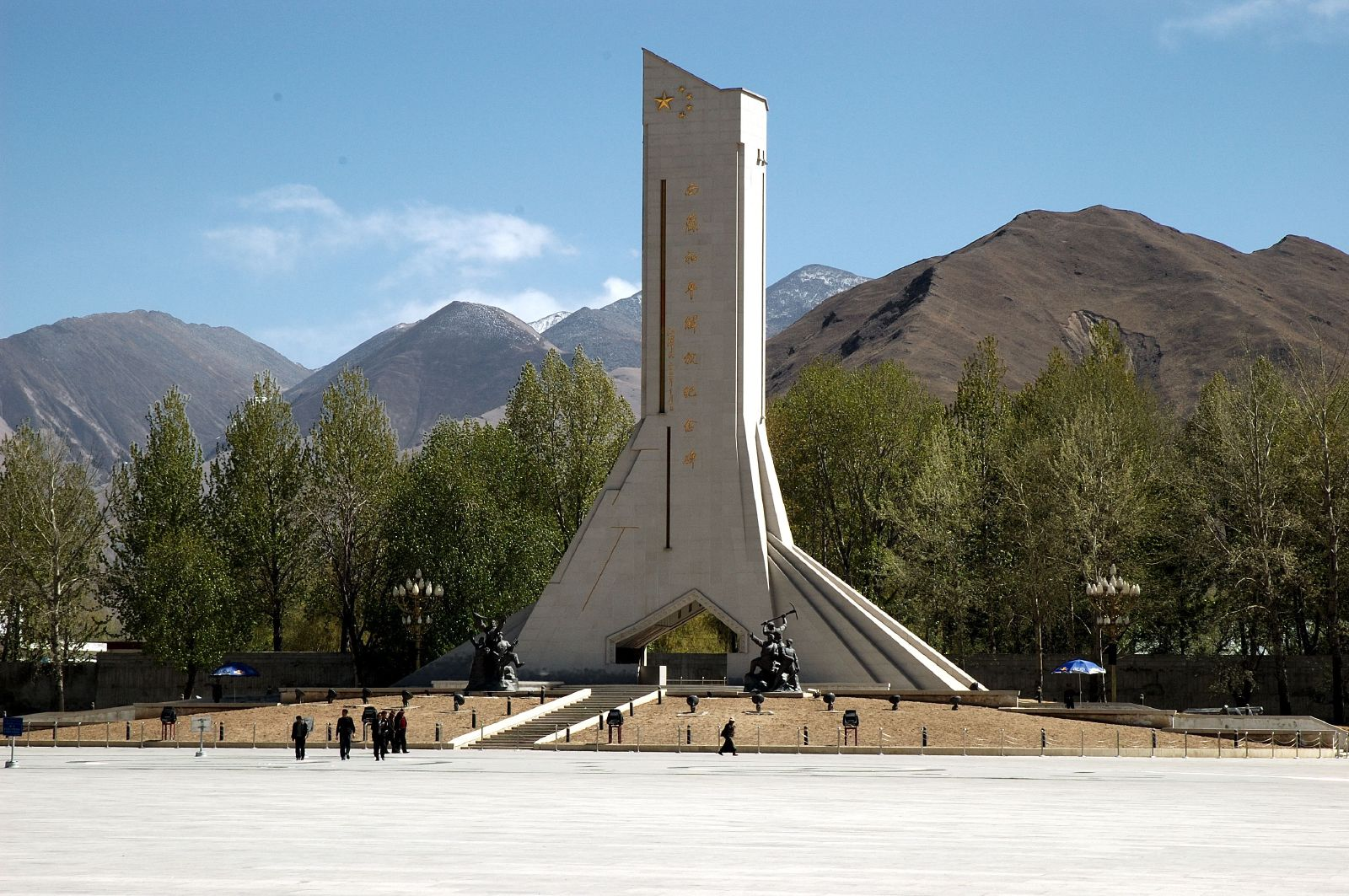
The Monument to the Peaceful Liberation of Tibet in the Potala square (2007)

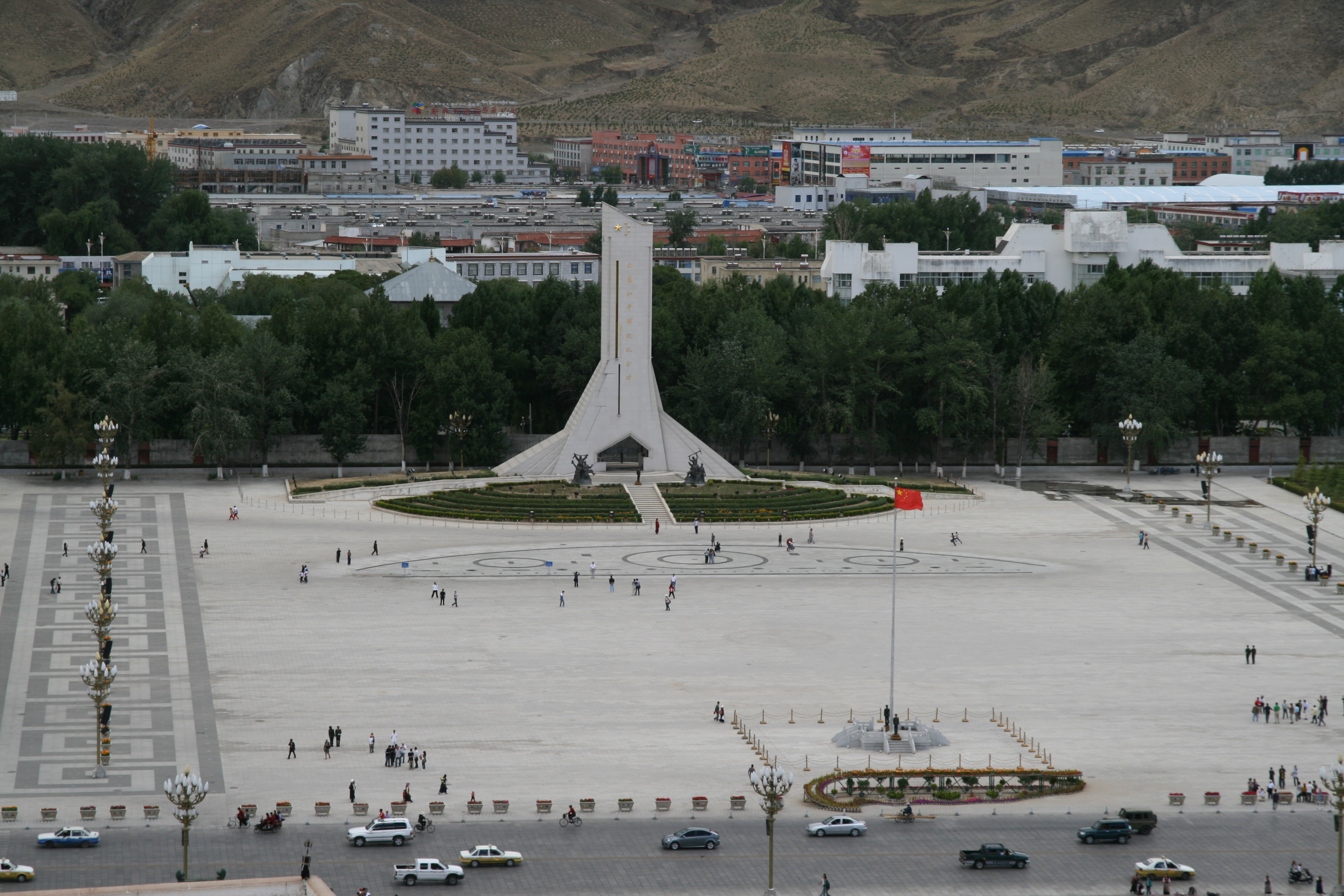
The memorial in its setting, the Potala square

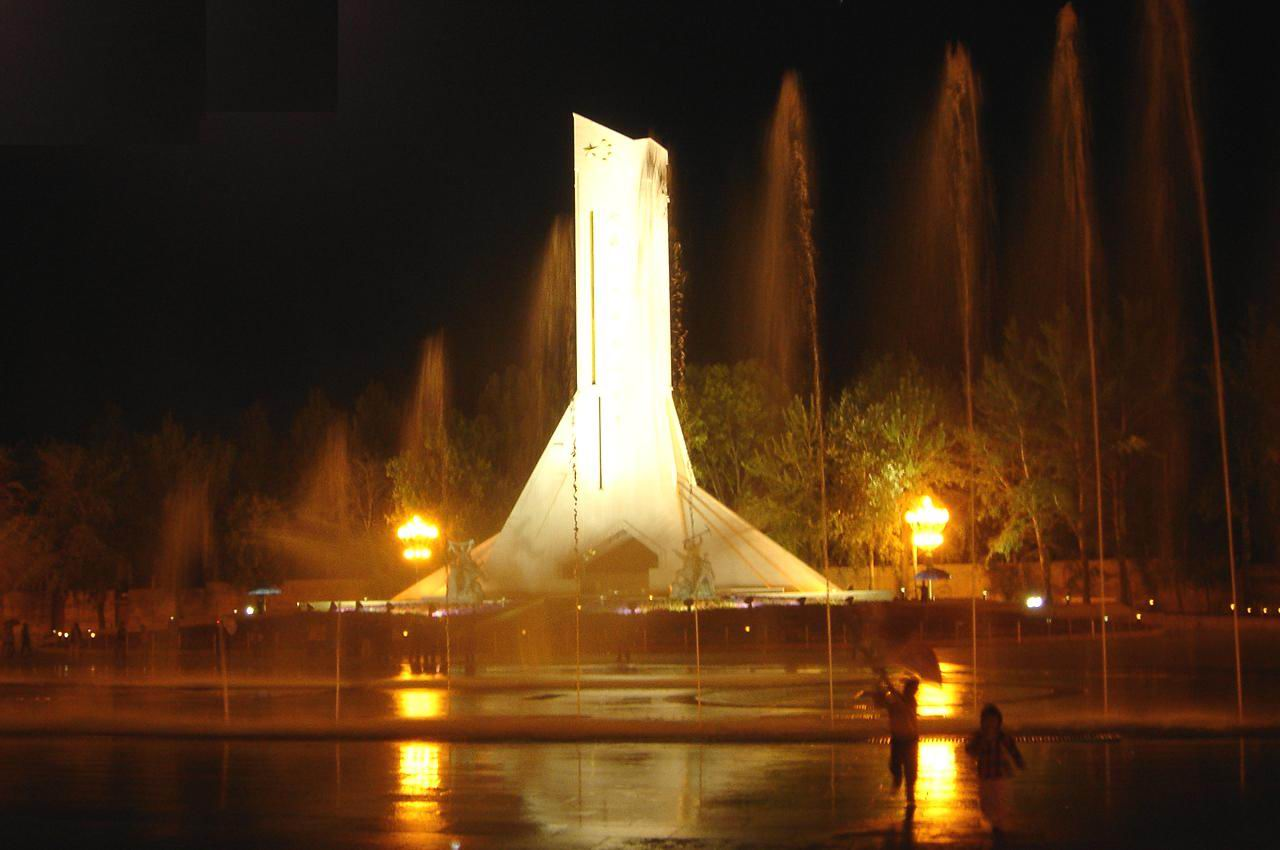
The monument lit-up at night, with waterworks in front of it (2006)

The Monument to the Peaceful Liberation of Tibet (Chinese: 西藏和平解放纪念碑) stands in the southern part of the Potala Palace Square in Lhasa, Tibet Autonomous Region just outside the protective zone and buffer zone of the World Heritage Site. It celebrates what the People's Republic of China calls the "Peaceful Liberation of Tibet" by the People's Liberation Army, or what the exiled Tibetan government calls the invasion and annexation of Tibet. The foundation stone was laid on July 18, 2001 by Hu Jintao, China's vice-president at the time. The monument was unveiled on May 22, 2002.

== Structure ==
The US $1.7 million, 37-meter-high spire-like concrete structure was designed by Professor Qi Kang of the Southeast University in Nanjing, China. The monument abstractly portrays Mount Everest. The monument bears its own name engraved in the calligraphy of former general secretary and president Jiang Zemin, while an inscription refers to the expelling of "imperialist" forces from Tibet in 1951 (a reference to long-running Anglo-Russian Great-Game designs on the region) and reports on the socio-economic development achieved since then.

The southern side of the monument is inscribed with an inscription in both Tibetan and Chinese characters, of which the Chinese is as follows:

On May 23, 1951 A.D., the Agreement between the Central People's Government and the Local Government of Tibet on Measures for the Peaceful Liberation of Tibet was signed in Beijing. The People's Liberation Army marched into Tibet, expelled the imperialist forces, and Tibet was peacefully liberated. From then on, Tibet entered a new era of transition from darkness to light, from backwardness to progress, from poverty to affluence, from autocracy to democracy, and from feudalism to openness.

In 1959, Tibet quelled the rebellion, carried out democratic reforms, abolished the feudal serf system of unity of government and religion, and liberated millions of serfs who became masters of their own house. In 1965, the Tibet Autonomous Region was established, realizing regional ethnic autonomy and embarking on the road to socialism. After the reform and opening up of the country, the economy has developed rapidly, culture has become more and more prosperous, society is peaceful and progressive, and the people live and work in peace and contentment.

On the occasion of the 50th anniversary of the peaceful liberation of Tibet, we would like to erect this monument to commemorate the martyrs and show them to future generations.

Tibet Autonomous Region People's Government

July 18, 2001 A.D.

== Gallery ==
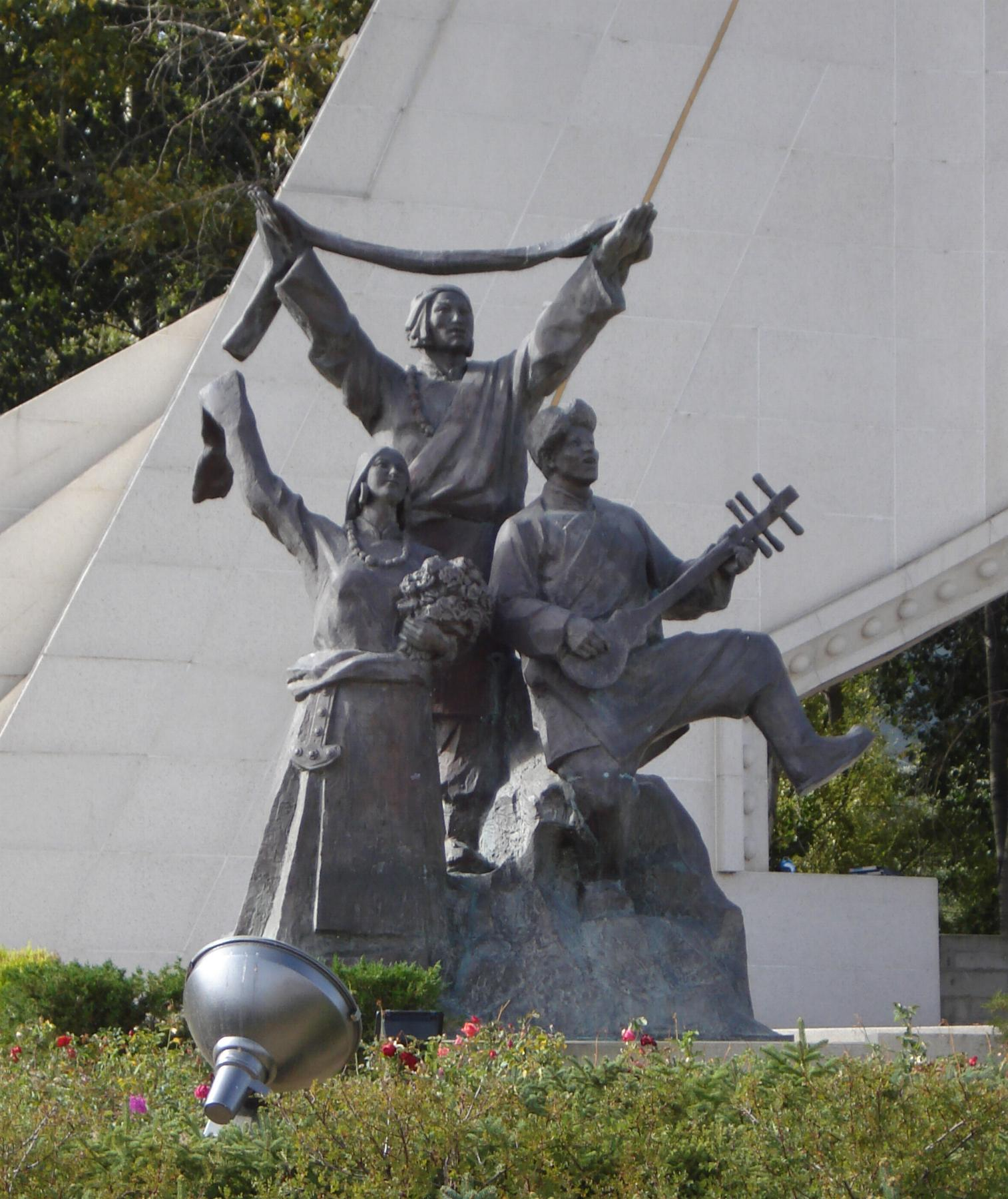
Left group of statues outside the memorial

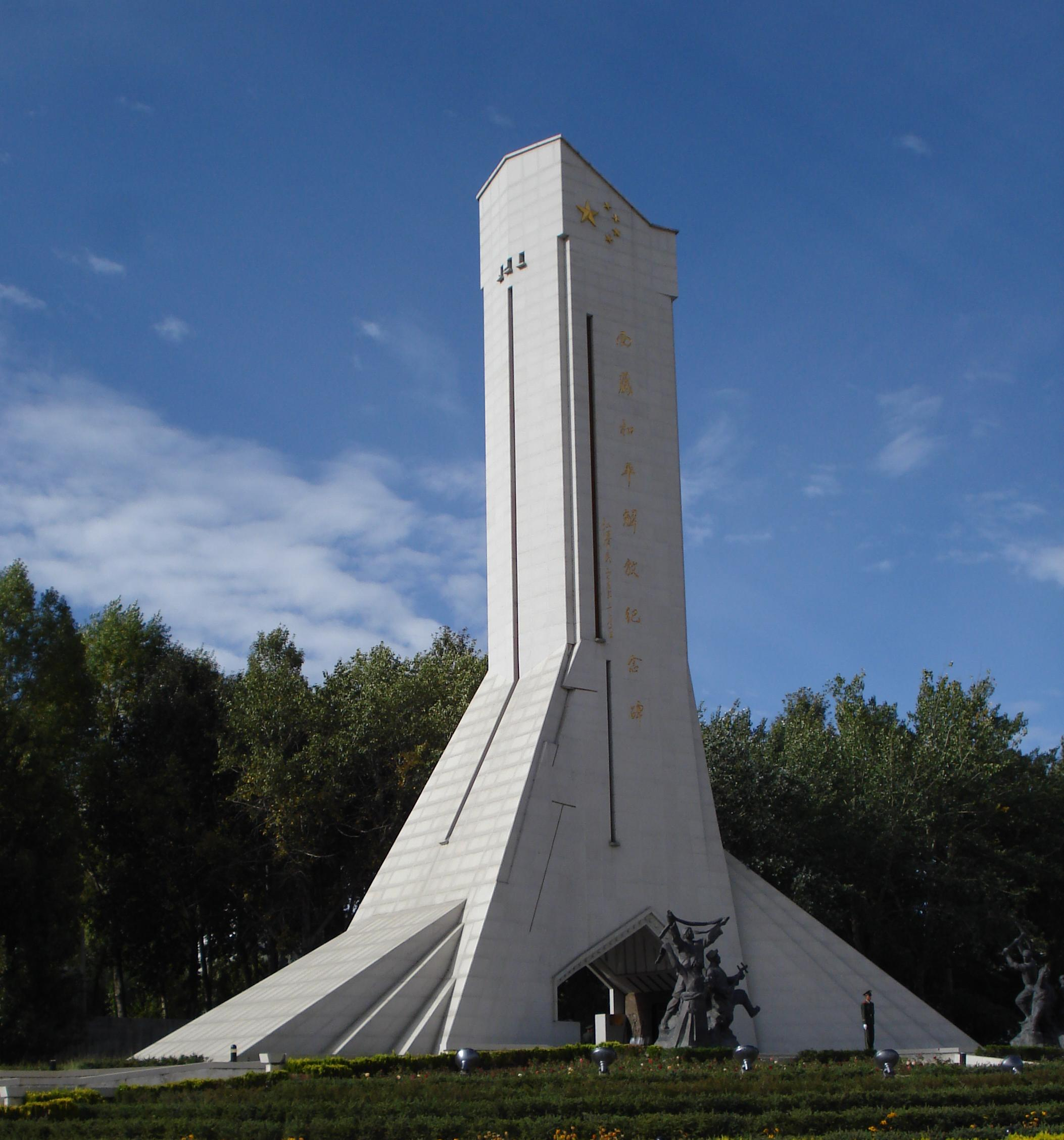
The spire-like Mount Quomolongma (Everest)

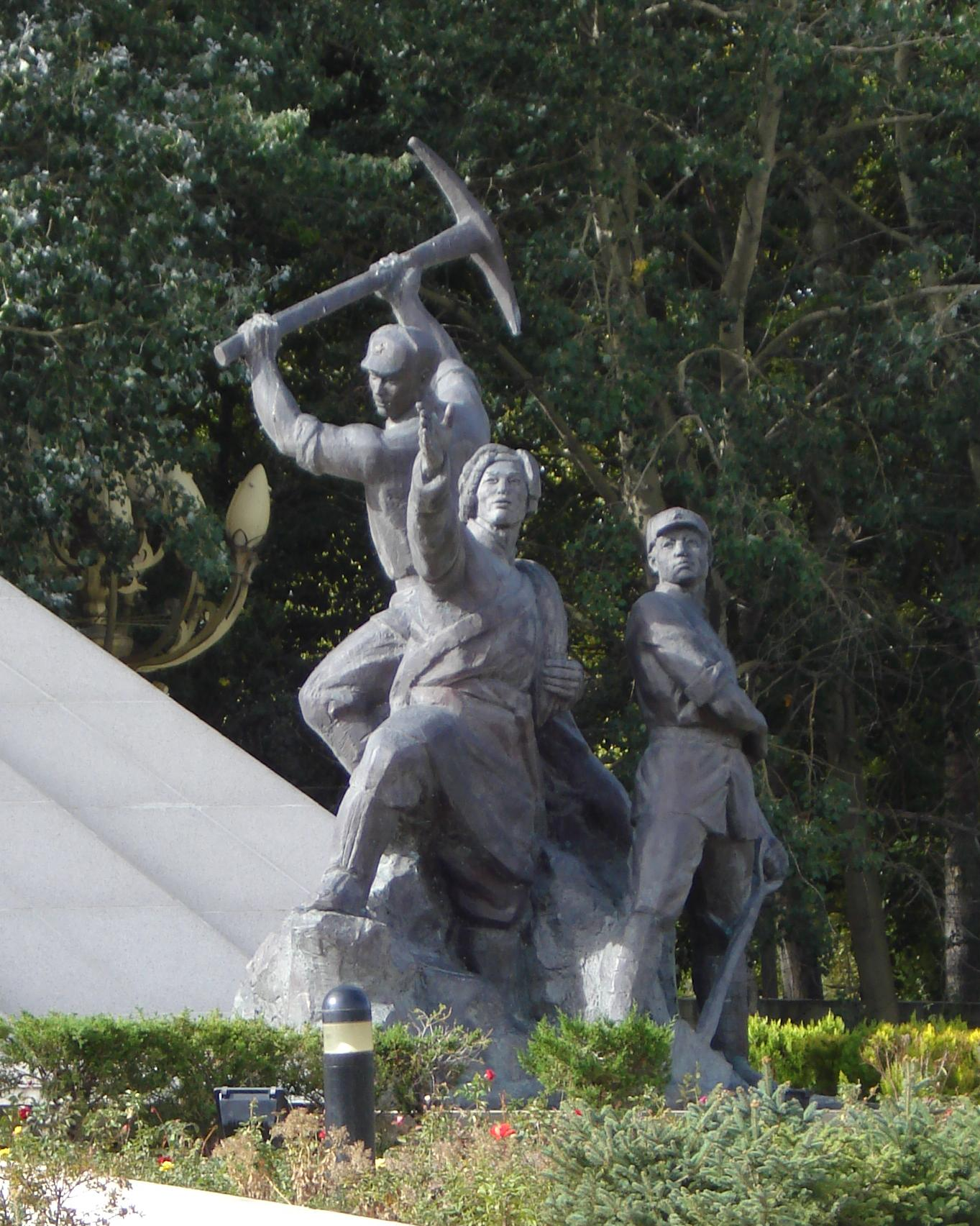
Right group of statues outside the memorial

== See also ==
- History of Tibet (1950–present)
- Tibet (1912–1951)
