= Lhasa Mass Culture and Sports Center =

Sports and culture venue in Lhasa, Tibet, China

Coordinates: 29.62489°N 91.0897°E

Lhasa Mass Culture and Sports Center (Chinese: 拉萨市群众文化体育中心), located in Liwu New District, Lhasa, Tibet Autonomous Region, is a comprehensive venue integrating stadium, gymnasium and Tibet Yak Museum, and is also the highest elevation modern stadium in the world.

== History ==
Lhasa Mass Culture and Sports Center is located in the east of Chaguo Avenue, south of Olympic Avenue, west of East Ring Road and north of Liuwu Xincun Road. Lhasa Mass Culture and Sports Center is the cornerstone project for the 60th anniversary of the annexation of Tibet by the People's Republic of China, and became the largest mass activity center in the Tibet Autonomous Region after its completion. The project was built with the aid of Beijing Municipality, with a total floor area of 67,501,000 square meters, the largest single project in the 20 years of Beijing's aid to Tibet, with a total investment of about 750 million RMB from Beijing's aid to Tibet, including "one stadium and two halls" (the stadium, gymnasium, and the Tibetan Yak Museum) and the music plaza. The stadium can accommodate 30,000 people, the gymnasium has 6,000 seats, and the yak museum covers an area of more than 8,000 square meters.

On August 31, 2011, the groundbreaking ceremony for the Lhasa Mass Culture and Sports Center was held at the project construction site. On July 3, 2012, construction began. On August 18, 2013, the stadium achieved the roofing of the main structure. In September 2014, the stadium was put into use. In October 2014, the Lhasa Mass Culture and Sports Center was fully completed and passed acceptance. In November 2015, the Lhasa Mass Culture and Sports Center, a key project of Beijing's aid to Tibet constructed by Beijing Uni-Construction Group (Chinese: 北京住总集团), won the Luban Award (China Construction Luban Award), the highest award in China's construction industry.

In February 2015, after the establishment of Lhasa Jodo Men's Basketball Club, the home court was located in the gymnasium of Lhasa Mass Culture and Sports Center. On September 7, 2018, the opening cultural performance of the 4th China Tibet Tourism and Culture International Expo was held at the Lhasa Mass Culture and Sports Center.

== Tibet Yak Museum ==
Located at No. 6, Tsagao Avenue, Liwu New District, Lhasa, Tibet Autonomous Region of China, east of Lhasa Railway Station, the Tibet Yak Museum (Chinese: 西藏牦牛博物馆) is a thematic museum showcasing yak culture.

At the end of 2010, the idea of building the Tibet Yak Museum was put forward. At that time, the main leaders of Beijing gave their support to this idea and listed this museum as the cultural and creative project of Lhasa, which was included in the overall project of Lhasa Mass Culture and Sports Center. At the end of 2011, the preparatory office of the Tibet Yak Museum was established, and in 2012, the main building project was started, and at the end of 2012, the Cultural Relics Bureau of the Tibet Autonomous Region approved the establishment of the Tibet Yak Museum, and the Tibet Yak Museum was opened for trial operation on May 18, 2014, the International Museum Day. During the December 15, 2016 to March 15, 2017, the Tibet Yak Museum organized the "Yak in the Capital Museum" at the Capital Museum in Beijing.
