= Tibet Museum of Natural Science =

Museum in Lhasa, Tibet, China

Coordinates: 29.64941°N 91.18047°E

Tibet Museum of Natural Science (西藏自然科学博物馆) is a comprehensive museum of natural science, the main museum is located at No. 9, Zangda East Road, Chengguan District, Lhasa in Tibet Autonomous Region, China.

== History ==
The Tibet Museum of Natural Science is a large comprehensive museum of public welfare which is a nature museum, science and technology museum and exhibition hall. This is the first large comprehensive museum in the Tibet Autonomous Region. On October 8, 2010, the construction began. On October 1, 2015, it was completed and opened for trial operation, and on October 1, 2016, it officially opened for operation.

The museum a project planning land of 200 acres, an investment of 442.5 million yuan RMB, building area of 33,000 square meters; the second phase of the project is divided in the Tibet Autonomous Region in seven localities, municipalities of the theme of the museum, has been included in the Tibet Autonomous Region "Twelfth Five-Year Plan" major projects.
