= Central Beijing Road =

Road in China

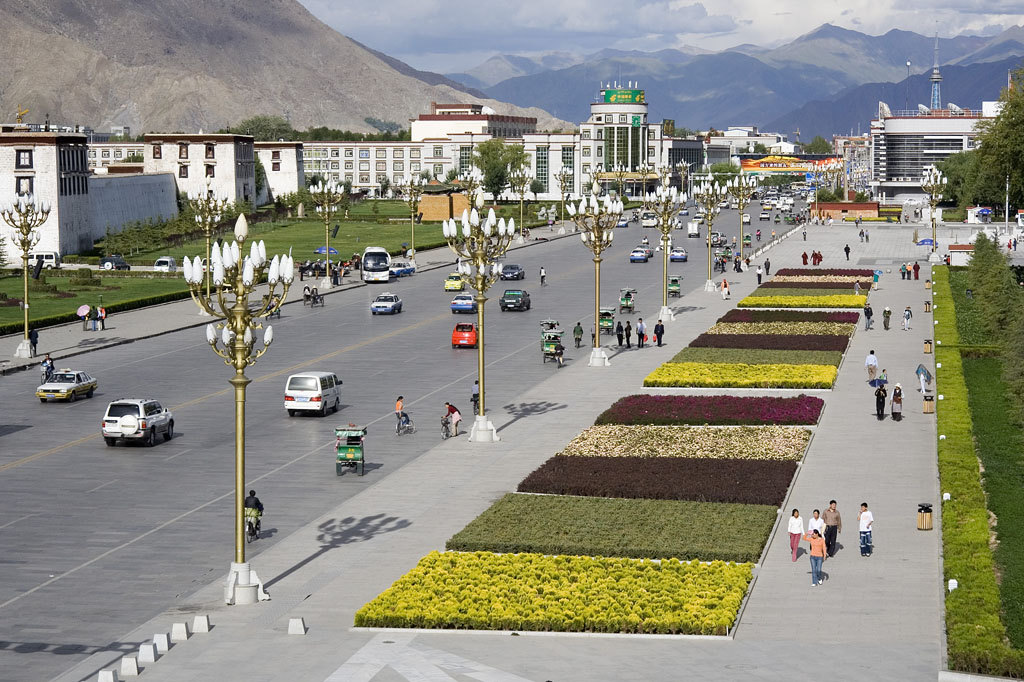
Road with green pavement at the roadside

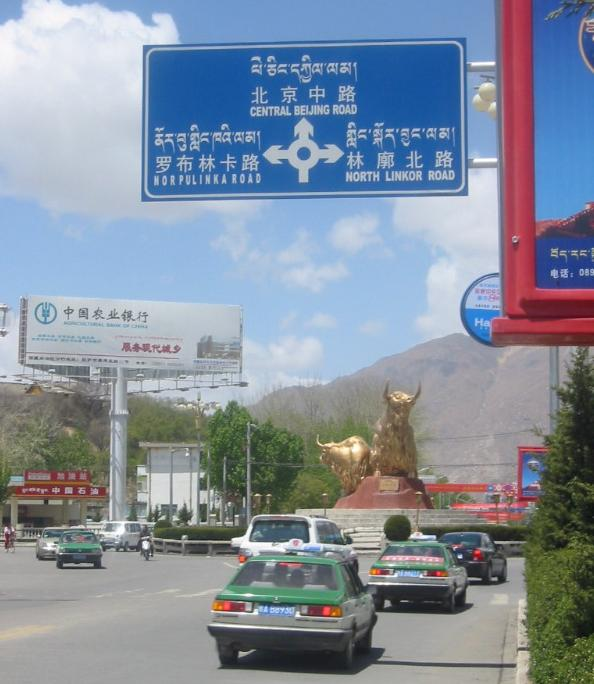
The intersection of Beijing Middle Road with Norbulingka Road and Lingkhor North Road in 2004. The golden sculpture is the Treasure of the Plateau

Central Beijing Road, or Beijing Middle Road(Tibetan: པེ་ཅིང་དཀྱིལ་ལམ་, Wylie: pe cing dkyil lam, Chinese: 北京中路) is a major east-west road in the Chengguan District of Lhasa, Tibet Autonomous Region, China.

== History ==
In July 1994, the Central Government's Third Symposium on Tibet Work determined that Beijing Municipality and Jiangsu Province would support the Lhasa City. In only six years since then, Beijing and Jiangsu Province have already assisted Lhasa City with many projects. Among them, Beijing invested RMB 2.54 million yuan in the reconstruction of the west section of Beijing Middle Road for Lhasa without compensation.
