= Norbulingka Road =

Road in Lhasa, Tibet, China

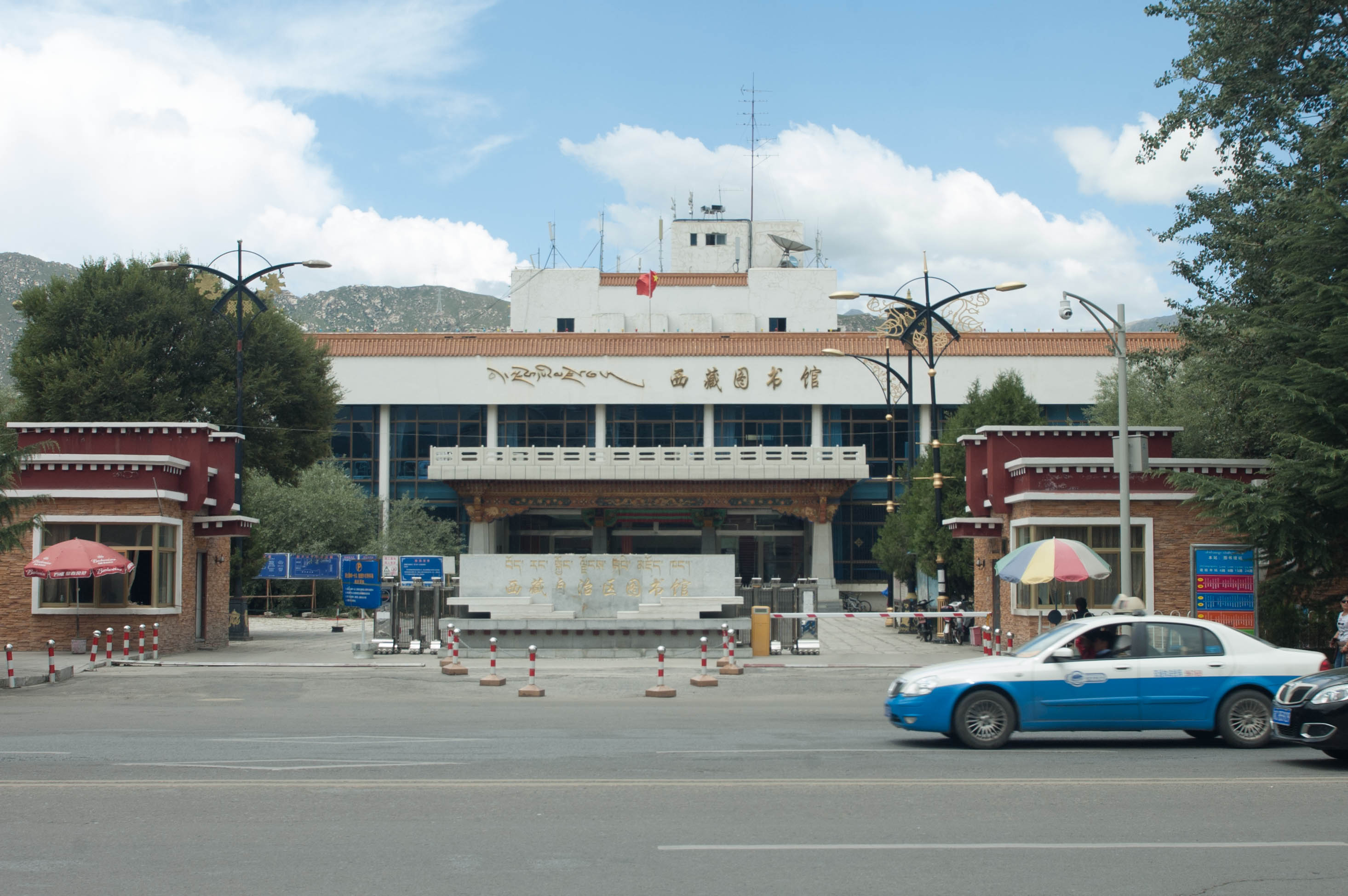
Tibet Library and its south side of the Norbulingka Road

Norbulingka Road (罗布林卡路), is a major road in Lhasa, Tibet Autonomous Region.

== History ==
Norbulingka Road is a road running from southwest to northeast. It leads to the gate on the east side of Norbulingka in the west, and connects with Minzu Middle Road and Minzu South Road. It connects with Beijing Middle Road in the east. The middle part of the road connects with Lingkhor West Road. Along the way, there are Tibet Library, Tibet Museum, Chagpori Park, etc.
