= North Linkor Road =

Major road of the city of Lhasa in the Tibet Autonomous Region of China

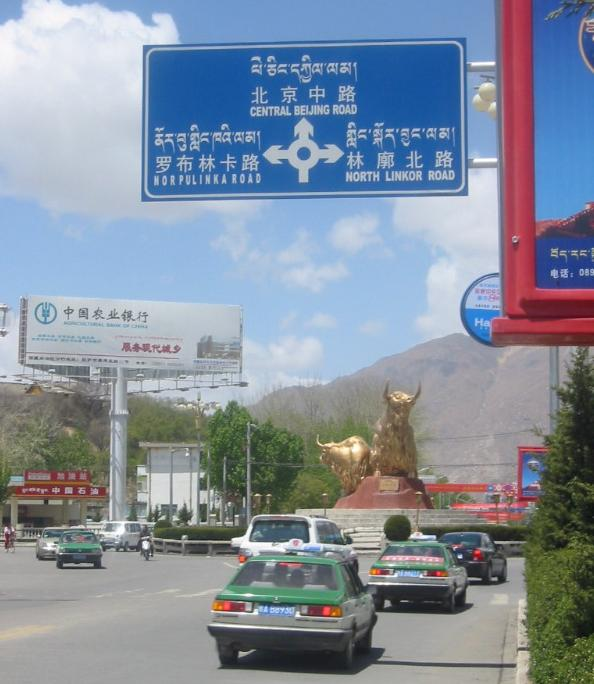
North Linkor Road connects the city to northern Tibet

North Linkor Road (Chinese: 林廓北路) is a major road of the city of Lhasa in the Tibet Autonomous Region of China which links the city to the north of Tibet.
