= Tibet Museum (Lhasa) =

Museum in Lhasa, Tibet, China

- 西藏博物馆
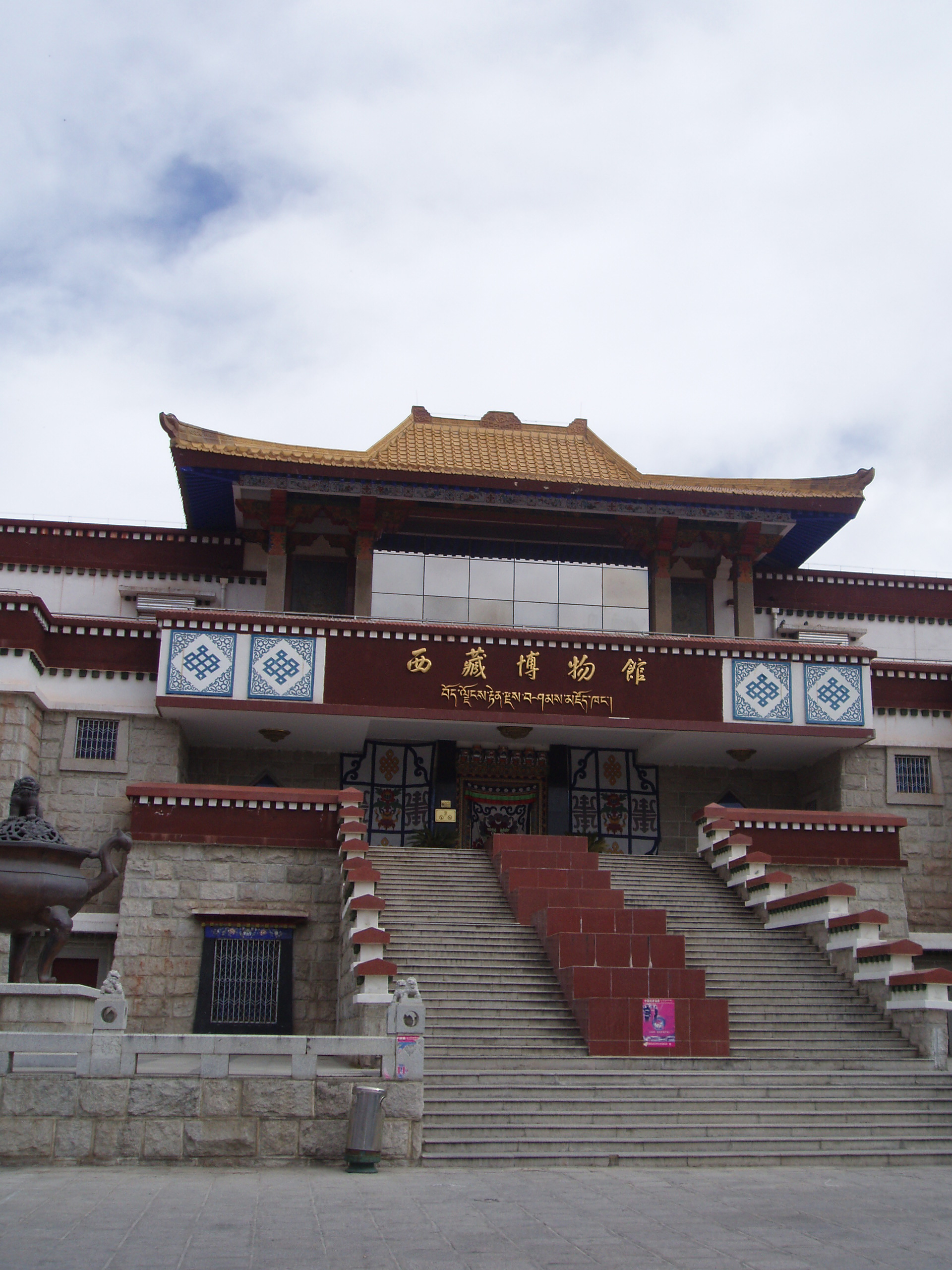

- Location within Tibet Autonomous Region
- Established: October 5, 1999
- Location: Lhasa, Tibet Autonomous Region, China
- Coordinates: 29.65133°N 91.09687°E
- Collection size: Approx. 520,000 pieces
- Website: http://www.tibetmuseum.cn/

The Tibet Museum (Tibetan: བོད་ལྗྗོངས་རྟེན་རྫས་བཤམས་མཛོད་ཁང་ Chinese: 西藏博物馆) is the official museum of the Tibet Autonomous Region of China in Lhasa. Inaugurated on October 5, 1999, it is the first large, modern museum in the Tibet Autonomous Region. It has a collection of more than 520,000 artifacts, including pottery, jade, and Buddha statues, attracting hundreds of thousands of visitors every year. It has a collection of around 1,000 artifacts permanently on display related to the cultural history of Tibet, from examples of Tibetan art to architectural design throughout history such as Tibetan doors and beams. In order to fill the museum the Tibet aristocracy and religious establishment had their property confiscated by the Chinese Government (Harris 2013:67).

== Exterior ==
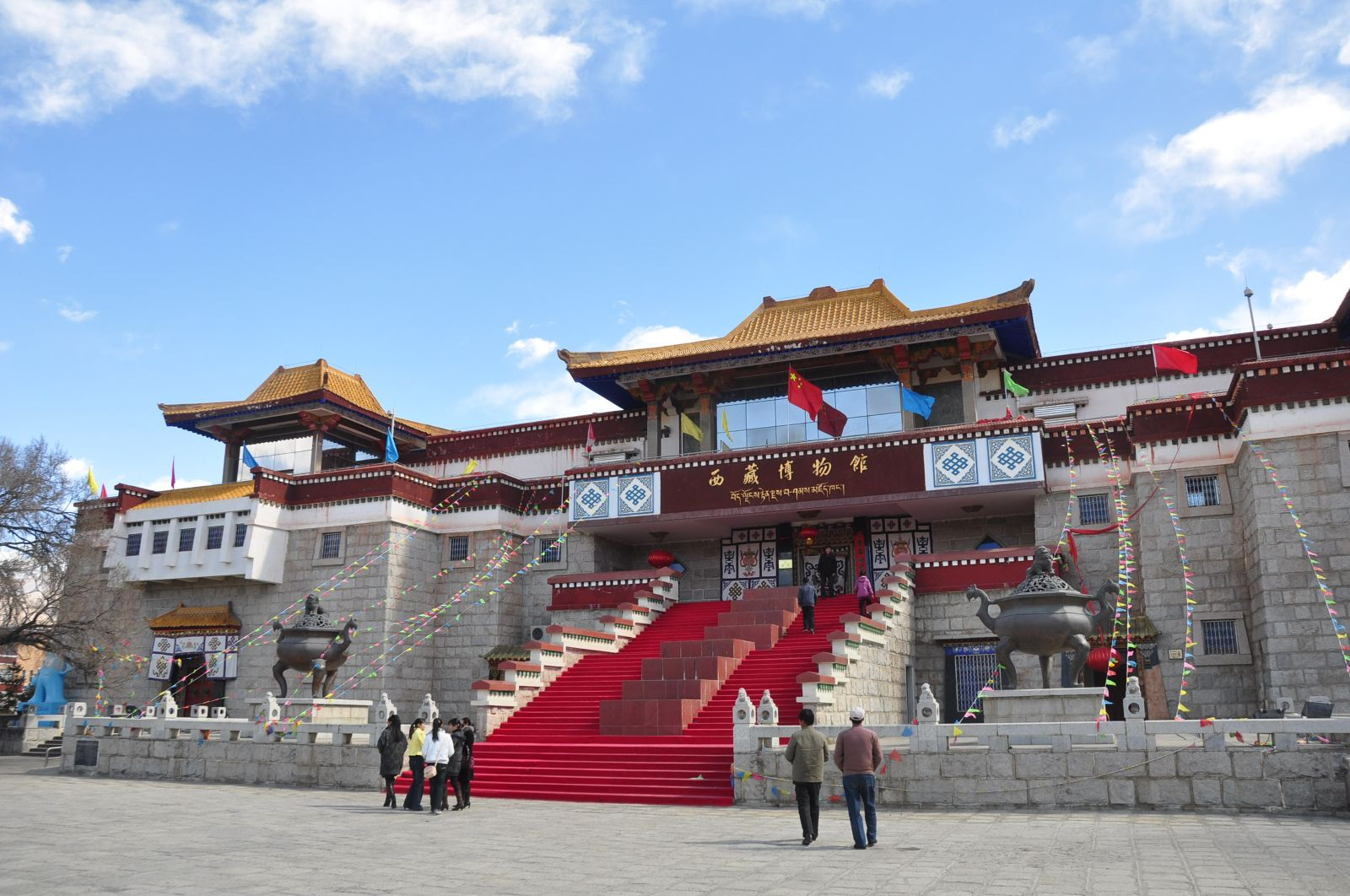
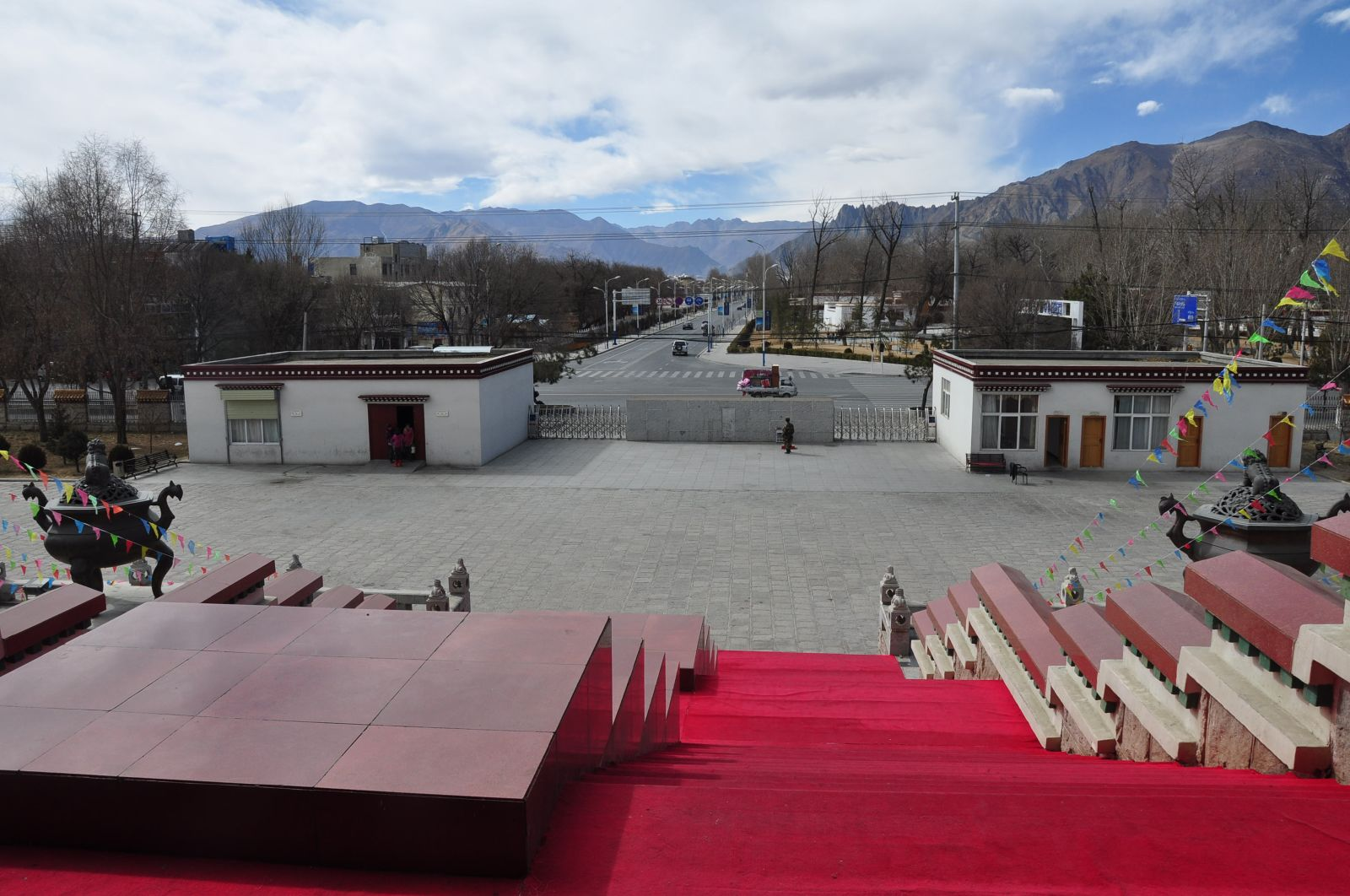
Exterior

The museum is a multimillion-dollar project. It is located in an L-shaped building situated directly below the Potala Palace on the corner of Norbulingka Road. The modern museum building fuses together traditional Tibetan architecture with the modern. It is a grey brick building with dark brown and white roof furnishings with a golden orange gilded roof. The museum is structured into three main sections: a main exhibition hall, a folk cultural garden and an administrative quarter. The central courtyard to the museum is uniquely designed, with a white, sleek-looking floor, and draws upon traditional monastic conventions. It features an origin, black and white design in the centre and has lighting through large skylight windows above. The museum covers an area of 53,959 square meters, with a total construction area of 23,508 square meters.

== Interior ==
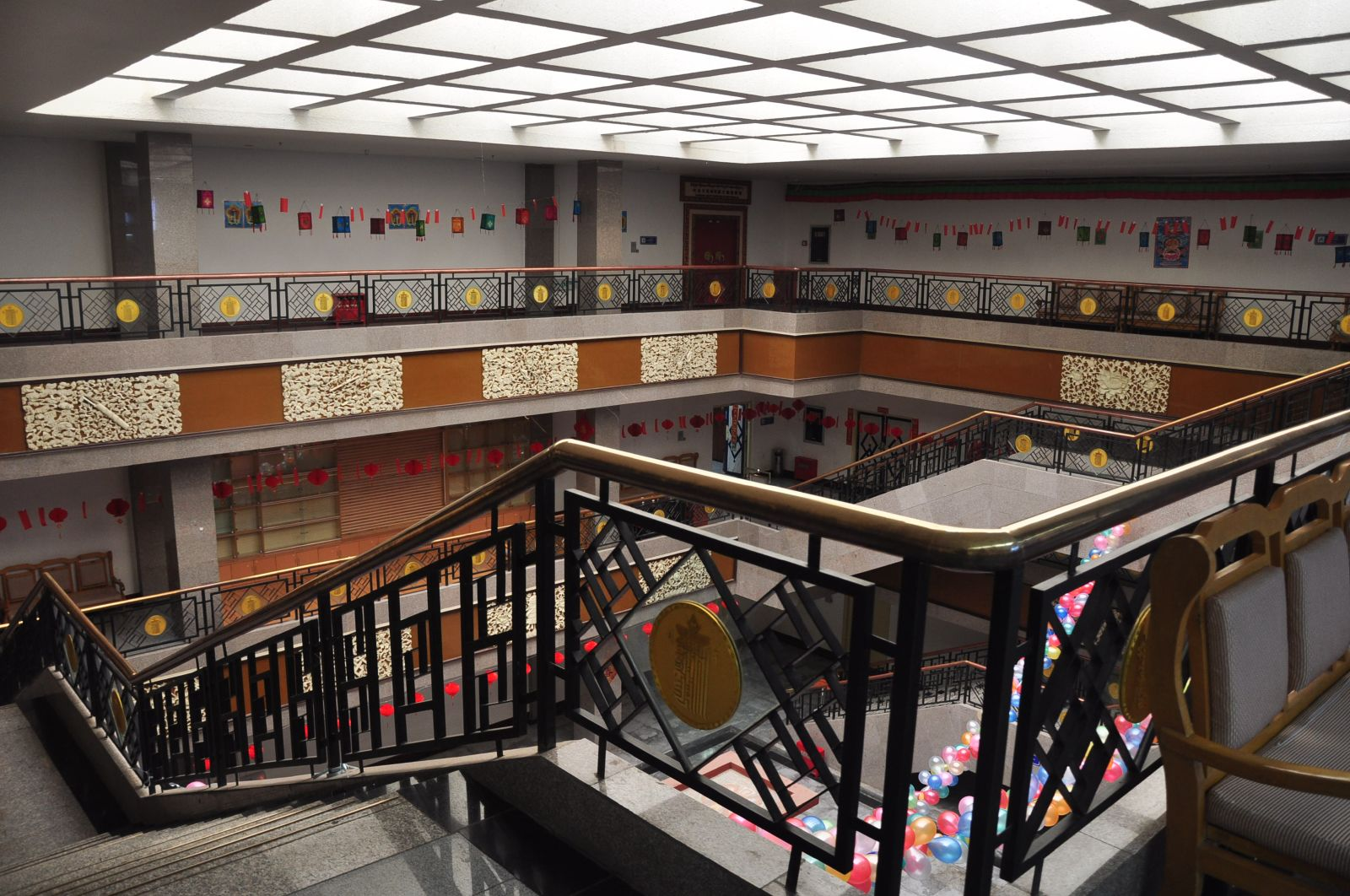
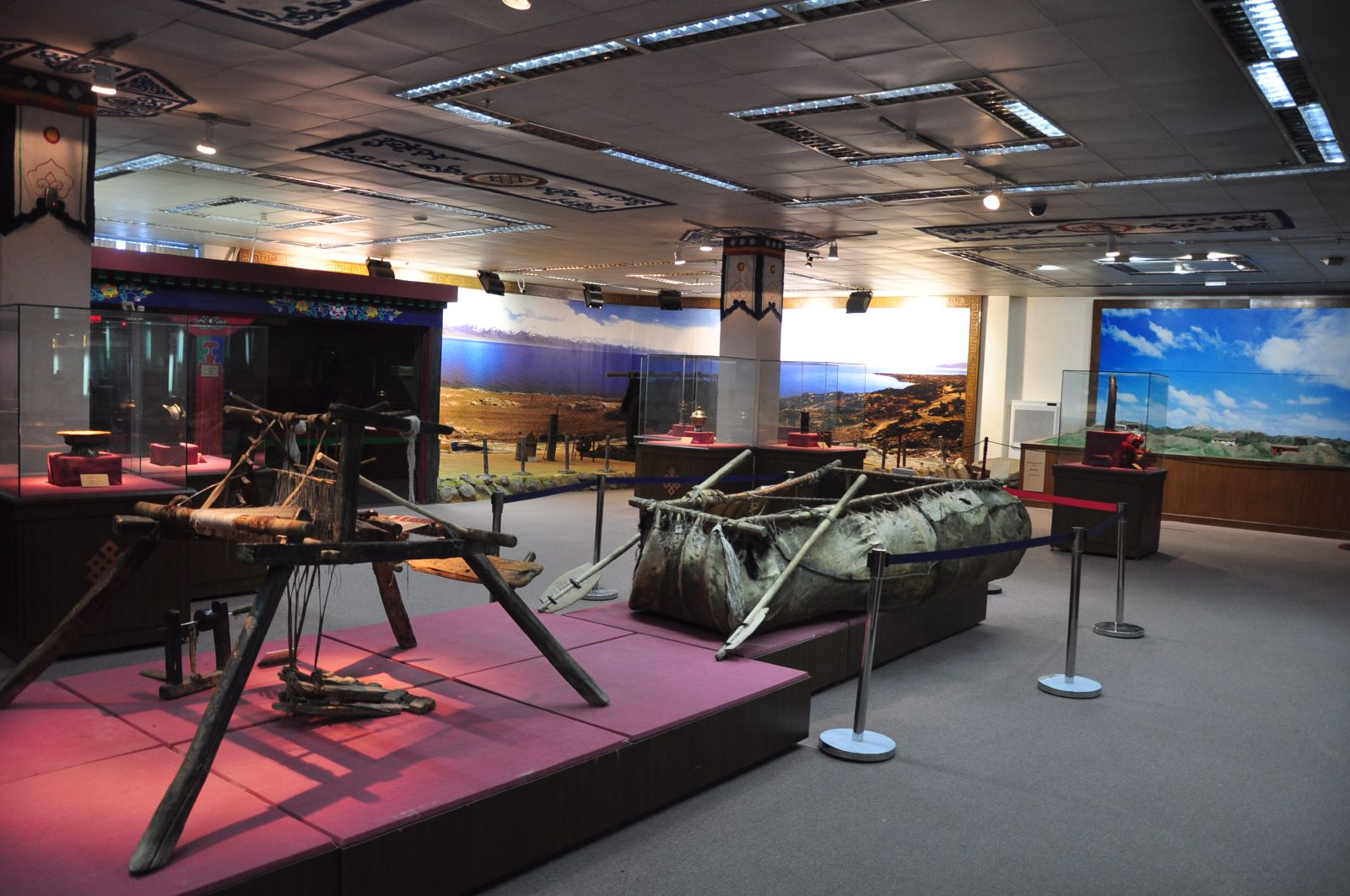
Left: Upper floor overlooking courtyard Right: Displays. Note the scenic large scale photographs and an old Tibetan boat

The area for the exhibition department covers 10,451 square meters. The History of Tibetan Culture Exhibition is divided into pre-history culture, indivisible history, culture and arts, and people's customs, exploring several thousand years of Tibetan history, politics, religion, cultural arts, and customs.

=== Prehistory ===
This section features items ranging in age from 50,000 to 3000 years old. Many of the items such as stone tools, pottery, bone objects and metal objects were unearthed at the Karuo and Qugong sites and are representative of the Neolithic culture of the Tibetan Plateau and the origins of the Tibetan people. There is also a room showing the variety of flora found in Tibet as well as several geological samples.

=== Political History ===
This section of the museum focuses on the different dynastic periods of Tibetan history. The museum has many seals, books, official documents and gifts from Emperors, offering an insight into the political exchanges between the Han Dynasty officials and the Tibetan leaders and the relationship between the Chinese central government and the Tibetan regional garpons. Tourists can see the original copy of the 17-point agreement signed in 1951 marking China's annexation of Tibet, take an audio tour and see the Golden Urn that China used to select a disputed Panchen Lama.

=== Cultural Arts ===
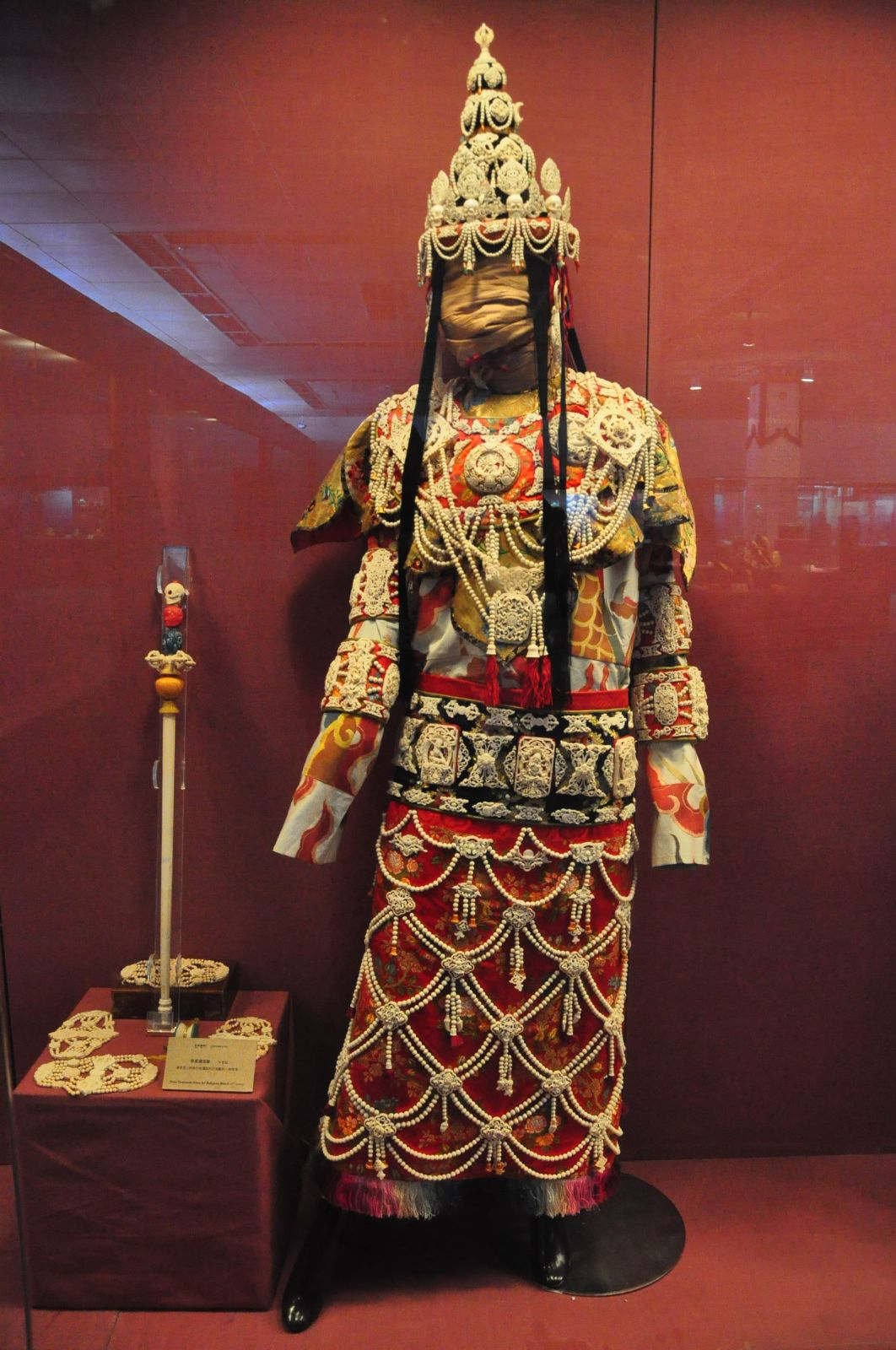
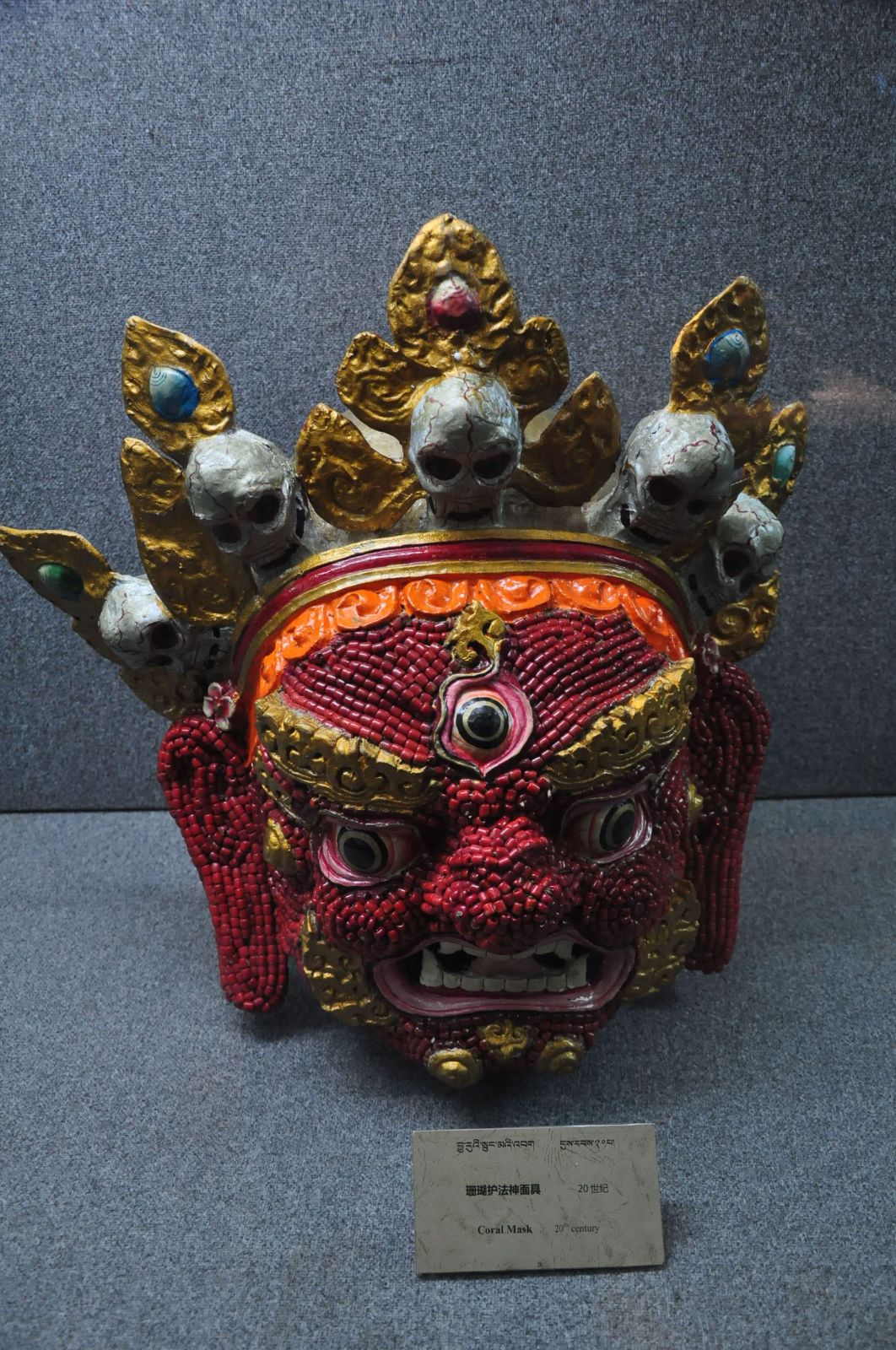
Cultural items. Shown on the right is a coral mask

This section is divided into 8 main areas exploring Tibetan culture. These include Tibetan-script books, documents and scrolls, the arts of Tibetan theatre, Tibetan musical instruments, Tibetan medicine, Tibetan astronomy and calendar reckoning (including charts), Tibetan sculpture, and thangka painting and arts. The exhibited artefacts are protected by the Tibetan Autonomous Region Cultural Relics Bureau on account of the uniqueness and cultural value of some of the items. There are numerous statues of buddhas, bodhisattvas, and figures, masks, rare sutras written on pattra leaves and birch bars, and manuscripts written with gold, silver and coral powder. There are many items of Tibetan handicrafts, and invaluable jewellery such as gold, silver and jade items.

=== People's Culture, Ethnography ===
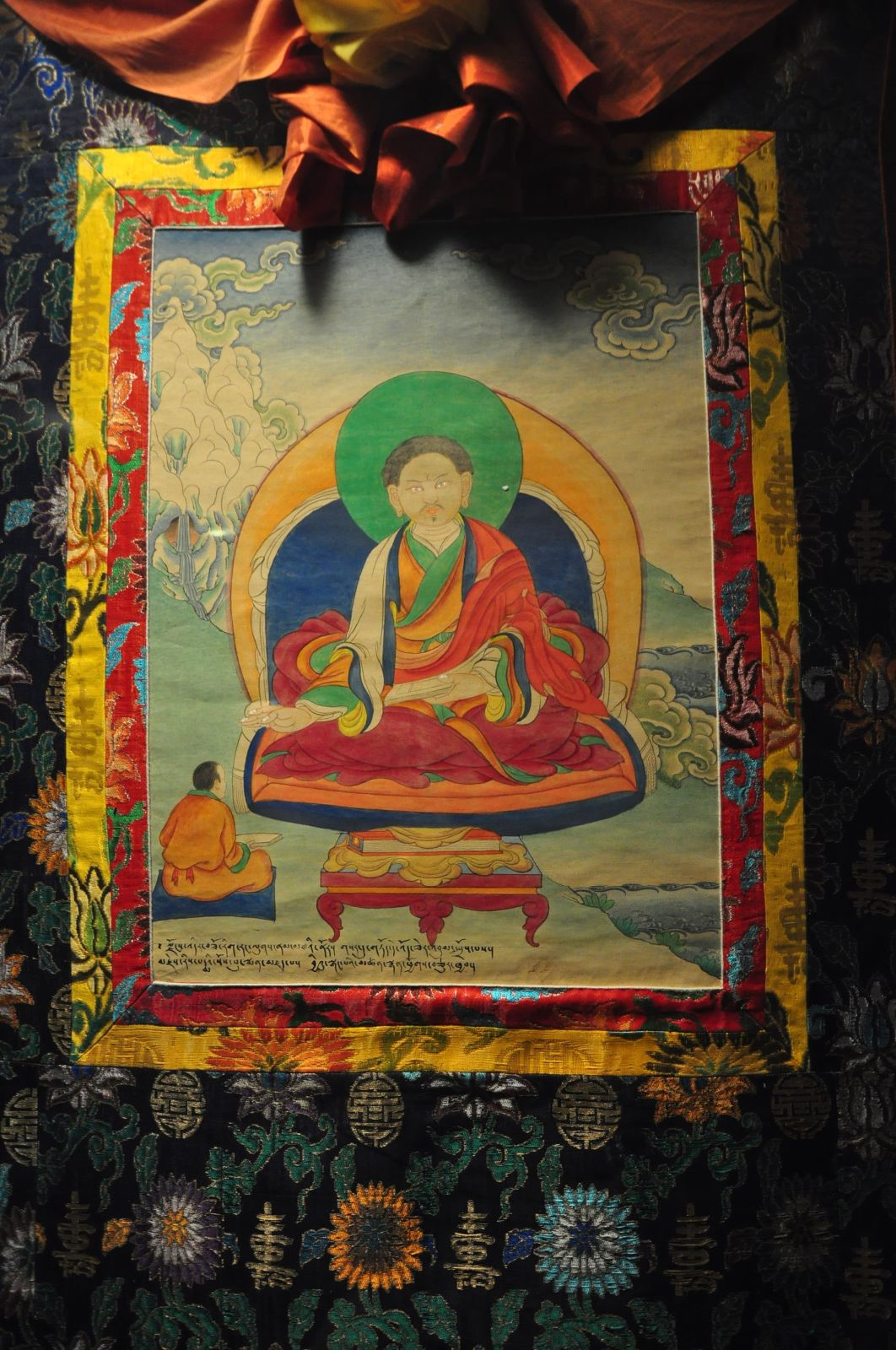
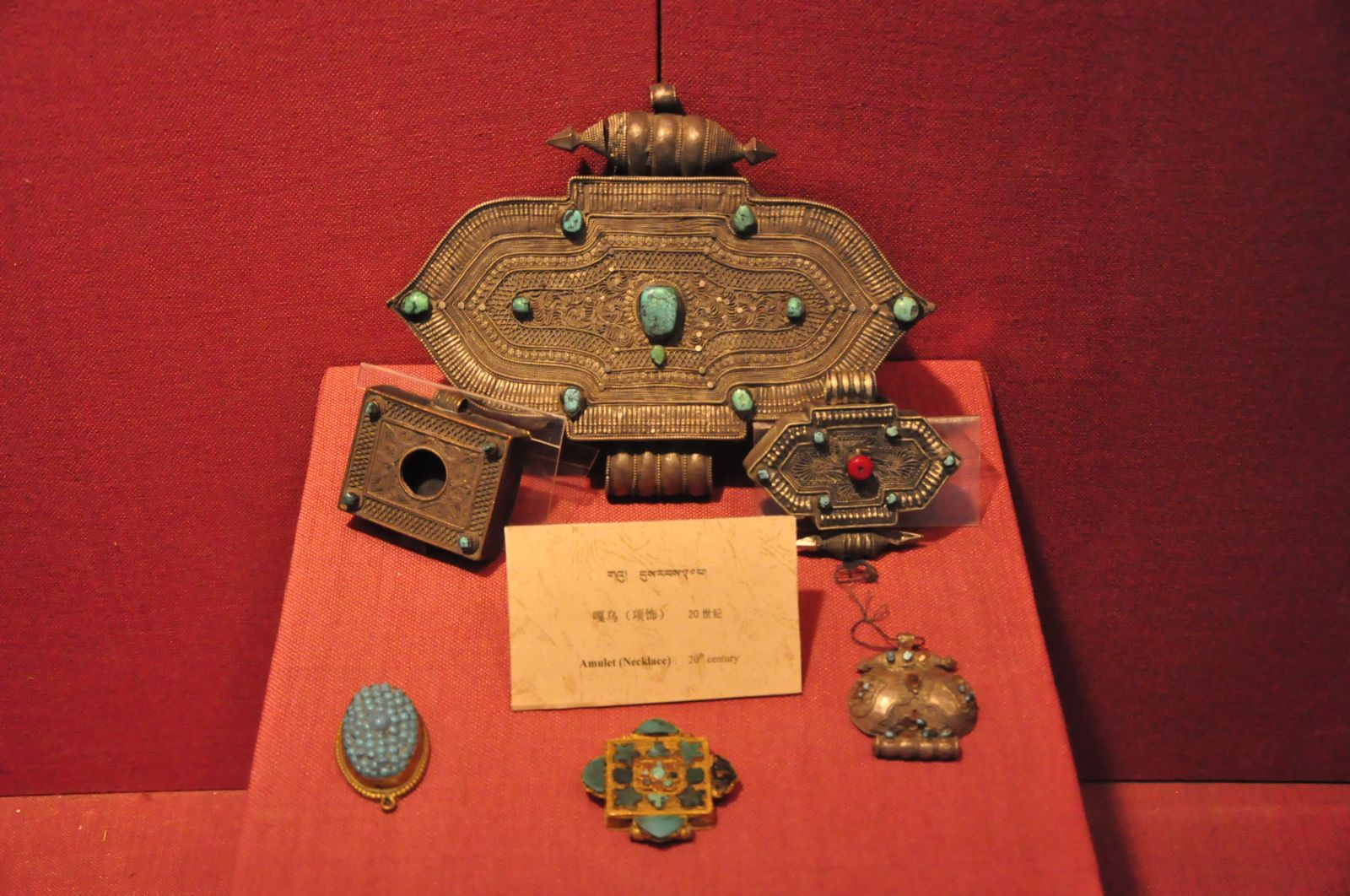
Left: Thangka. Right: Amulet.

This section is divided into six main areas, including explorations into the Tibetan people's costumes and style of dress, everyday tools and utensils, arts and handicrafts, and ways of communication. The museum displays provide an important insight into the domestic practices of the Tibetan people, as well as the influence of Han culture on the Tibetans.

== See also ==
- List of tourist attractions in China
- List of largest art museums
