= Bhrikuti Municipality =

Bhrikuti भृकुटी नगरपालिका
- Municipality
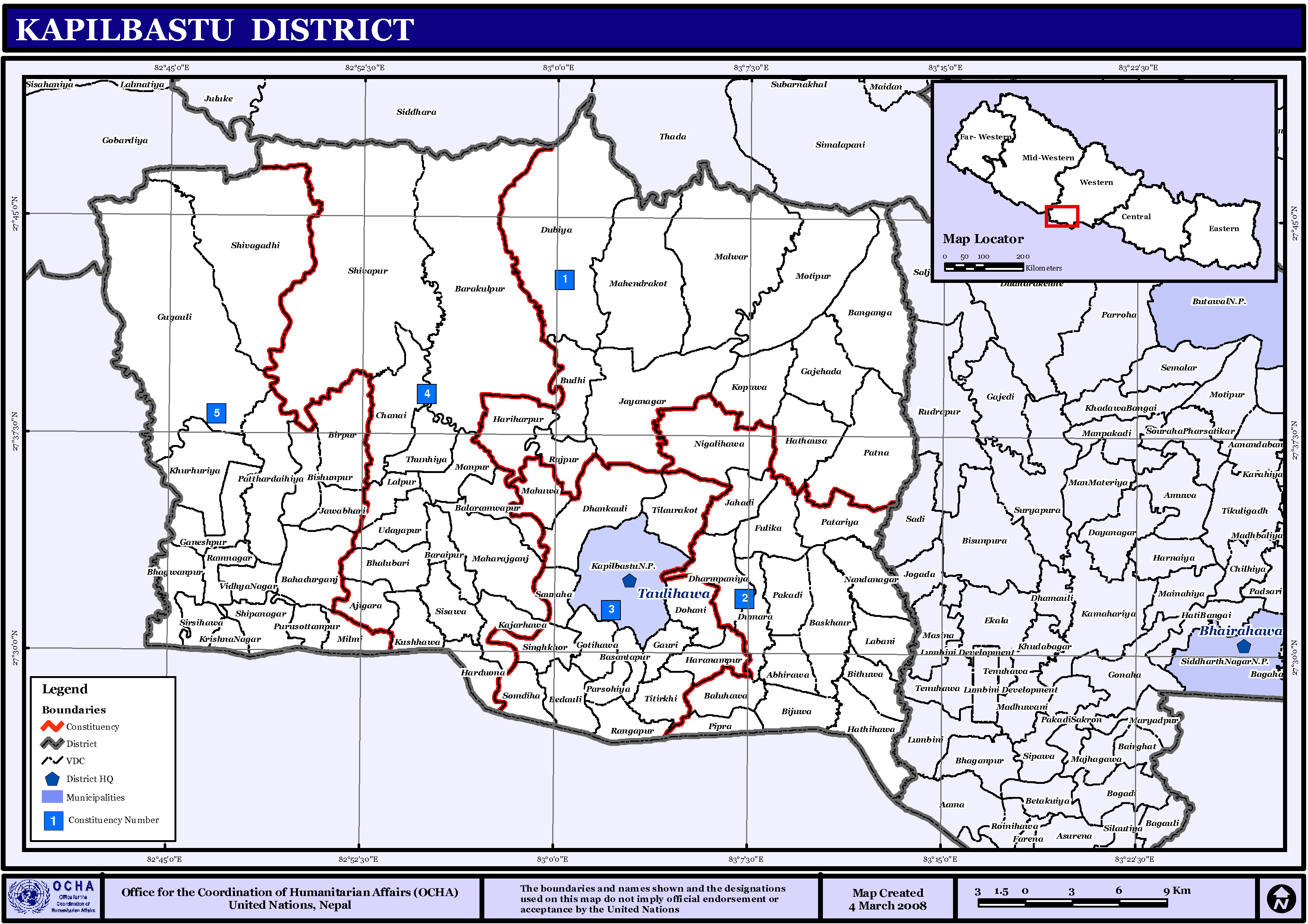

- Location in Nepal
- Coordinates: 27.39°N 83.36°E
- Country: Nepal
- District: Kapilvastu District

Area
  - Total: 149.8 km^{2} (57.8 sq mi)

Population (2011)
  - Total: 26,282
  - Density: 175.4/km^{2} (454.4/sq mi)
- Time zone: UTC+5:45 (NST)
- Area code: 076

Bhrikuti Municipality was a municipality in Kapilvastu District in Lumbini Province of Nepal that was established on 19 September 2015 by merging the two former Village development committees Budhi, Hariharpur, Rajpur and Barakulpur. The municipality has been merged into the Buddhabhumi Municipality since 2016. The administrative center of the municipality lied in the former Budhi VDC of Hanuman Bazaar area. At the time of the 2011 Nepal census it had a population of 26,282 people. The municipality is named after Bhrikuti, the first wife of the earliest emperor of Tibet.
