= List of Major National Historical and Cultural Sites in Tibet =

This is a list of the Major Historical and Cultural Sites Protected at the National Level in the autonomous region of Tibet, the People's Republic of China.

Site	Chinese name	Location	Designation	Image
Gyantse Dzong	江孜宗山抗英遗址 (Jiangzi Zongshan kang Ying yizhi)	28°57′00″N 89°38′00″E Gyantse County	1-5	Upload file
Jokhang	大昭寺 (Dazhao si)	29°39′11″N 91°02′51″E Lhasa	1-81	Upload file
Tradruk Temple	昌珠寺 (Changzhu si)	29°11′38″N 91°46′19″E Nêdong County	1-82	Upload file
Sakya Monastery	萨迦寺 (Sajia si)	28°54′18″N 88°01′05″E Sa'gya County	1-95	Upload file
Potala Palace	布达拉宫 (Budala gong)	29°39′28″N 91°07′01″E Lhasa	1-107	Upload file
Ganden Monastery	噶丹寺 (Gadan si)	29°45′29″N 91°28′30″E Dagzê County	1-108	Upload file
Tashilhunpo Monastery	扎什伦布寺 (Zhashilunbu si)	29°16′03″N 88°52′52″E Shigatse	1-109	Upload file
Guge Kingdom ruins	古格王国遗址 (Guge wangguo yizhi)	Zanda County	1-161	Upload file
Tombs of the Tibetan Kings	藏王墓 (Zangwang mu)	29°01′N 91°41′E Qonggyai County	1-174	Upload file
Drepung Monastery	哲蚌寺 (Zhebang si)	29°40′35″N 91°02′51″E Lhasa	2-27	Upload file
Sera Monastery	色拉寺 (Sela si)	29°41′53″N 91°08′00″E Lhasa	2-28	Upload file
Norbulingka	罗布林卡 (Luobulinka)	29°39′14″N 91°05′30″E Lhasa	3-96	Upload file
Shalu Monastery	夏鲁寺 (Xialu si)	29°07′40″N 88°59′33″E Shigatse	3-118	Upload file
Karuo Site	卡若遗址 (Karuo yizhi)	Qamdo County	4-19	Upload file
Samye	桑耶寺 (Sangye si)	29°19′32″N 91°30′13″E Zhanang County	4-90	Upload file
Toling Monastery	托林寺 (Tuolin si)	Zanda County	4-110	Upload file
Zhatang Temple	扎塘寺 (Zhatang si)	Zhanang County	4-111	Upload file
Palcho Monastery	白居寺 (Baiju si)	28°57′00″N 89°38′00″E Gyantse County	4-160	Upload file
Lhagyili Palace	拉加里王宫遗址 (Lajiali wanggong yuzhi)	Qusum County	5-109	Upload file
Lieshan Tombs	烈山墓地 (Lieshan mudi)	Nang County	5-181	Upload file
Gyidui Tubo Tombs	吉堆吐蕃墓群 (Jidui Tubo muqun)	Lhozhag County	5-182	Upload file
Landgut Nanseling	朗色林庄园 (Langselin zhuangyuan)	Zhanang County	5-407	Upload file
Qoide Temple, Zhuoma Monastery, Stele of the Tang Embassy to India	曲德寺 (Qude si), 卓玛拉康 (Zhuoma lakang), 大唐天竺使出铭 (Da Tang Tianzhu shi chu ming)	Gyirong County	5-408	Upload file
Sekhar-Guthog Temple	色喀古托寺 (Sekagutuo si)	Lhozhag County	5-409	Upload file
Khorzhak Monastery	科迦寺 (Kejia si)	30°13′00″N 81°16′00″E Burang County	5-410	Upload file
Ramoche Temple	小昭寺 (Xiaozhao si)	29°39′31″N 91°07′49″E Lhasa	5-411	Upload file
Keru Lhakhang	吉如拉康 (Jirulakang)	Nêdong County	5-412	Upload file
Chamuqin Tombs	查木钦墓群 (Chamuqin muqun)	Lhatse County	6-283	Upload file
Sumkar Stone Stupa	松卡石塔 (Songka shita)	Zhanang County	6-762	Upload file
Nyethang Drolma Lhakhang	聂塘卓玛拉康 (Nietang Zhuoma lakang)	Qüxü County	6-763	Upload file
Chagyima Great Hall	查杰玛大殿 (Chajiema dadian)	Qamdo County	6-764	Upload file
Mindrolling Monastery	敏竹林寺 (Minzhulin si)	29°39′11″N 91°07′53″E Zhanang County	6-765	Upload file
Phuntsok Ling Monastery	平措林寺 (Pingcuolin si)	Lhatse County	6-766	Upload file
Bangna Temple	邦纳寺 (Bangna si)	Sog County	6-767	Upload file
Kangsong Sengalin	康松桑卡林 (Kangsong sengkalin)	Zhanang County	6-768	Upload file

== See also ==
- Principles for the Conservation of Heritage Sites in China
- Sinicization of Tibet
