= Hariharpur =

Hariharpur may refer to:

- Hariharpur, India
- Hariharpur, Dhanbad, village in Jharkhand, India
- Hariharpur, Baruipur, census town in West Bengal, India
- Hariharpur, Nepal (disambiguation), several places in Nepal
