= Xiaozhao =

Xiaozhao may refer to:

- Emperor Xiaozhao of Northern Qi
- Ramoche Temple, known as Xiaozhao Temple in Chinese
- Xiaozhao, a fictional character in The Heaven Sword and Dragon Saber characters
