= Hariharpur, Nepal =

Hariharpur, Nepal may refer to:

- Hariharpur, Bheri
- Hariharpur, Janakpur
- Hariharpur, Kapilvastu
- Hariharpur, Narayani
- Hariharpur, Parsa
- Hariharpur, Sagarmatha
