= Lhasa Martyrs' Mausoleum =

Building in China

Coordinates: 29.6513°N 91.06173°E

Lhasa Martyrs' Mausoleum (Chinese: 拉萨烈士陵园), or Lhasa Martyrs' Cemetery, is located next to No.4 Jinnong Lane, Jinzhu Middle Road, Lhasa, Tibet Autonomous Region, China. The mausoleum was built in 1955 and was remodeled in 1991.

== Architecture ==
Above the main gate of the Martyrs' Mausoleum is the inscription "Lhasa Martyrs' Mausoleum" in Chinese and Tibetan, and on both sides of the gate there are two lines extracted from Mao Zedong's poem "To Shaoshan" (Chinese: 到韶山), which reads: "For the sake of sacrifices, I dare to call for the sun and moon to change the sky for a new one." (Chinese: 为有牺牲多壮志, 敢叫日月换新天) The mausoleum has a square, a monument, a memorial hall, a martyrs' pavilion, a mausoleum, a wall, etc., and on the wall there is a directory of the martyrs who rest here.

- Martyrs' Pavilion: Inside the pavilion there are characters "Immortality" written by Mao Zedong.
- Twin Peaks Monument: "Revolutionary Martyrs Forever" is written on the monument in both Chinese and Tibetan languages.
- Lhasa Martyrs' Cemetery Memorial Hall
- Martyrs' Memorial Pavilion: located on the east and west sides of the platform where the monument is located, the stone tablets in the pavilion are engraved in Chinese and Tibetan with the gilded characters of "Vast Spirit Survives Forever" and "Light Shines in a Thousand Autumns".
- Kong Fansen's tomb: two stone tablets in front of the tomb are engraved with the inscription of Jiang Zemin, General Secretary of the Chinese Communist Party and Li Peng, Premier of the State Council of the People's Republic of China.

The mausoleum is divided into four areas:

- Martyrs' Tomb Area: located directly south of Martyrs' Pavilion. Martyrs, mainly for the December 1958 to April 1959 in the Shannan region and Lhasa city in the process of counter-insurgency martyrs of the Chinese People's Liberation Army. In addition, there are also mountaineers, geological explorers and road construction workers who were killed in the construction work in Tibet.
- Grave area of leading cadres: located in the northwest of the Martyrs' Pavilion. The burial of Xia Furen, Lobzang Tsultrim and other leading cadres.
- General Cemetery: located in the northeast of the Martyrs' Pavilion.
- Tomb area of "Cultural Revolution": located in the northwest of the Martyrs' Pavilion. A total of 74 graves, mainly buried the dead in Jokhang-fighting struggles during the cultural revolution.
