= Princess Wencheng =

Chinese princess, Tibetan queen (628–680)

Princess Wencheng 文成公主 རྒྱ་མོ་བཟའ་མུན་ཆང་ཀོང་ཅོ
- Tsenmo
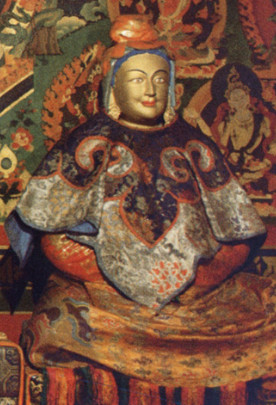
- Princess Wencheng

Queen consort of the Tibetan Empire
- Tenure: 641–680 or 682 alongside Bhrikuti, Rithigman, Shyalmotsun, Pogong Mangsa Tricham
- Born: 620; Tang dynasty
- Died: 680 or 682; Lhasa, Tibetan Empire
- Husband: Songtsen Gampo
- House: House of Li (by birth); House of Yarlung (by marriage)
- Father: Unknown, presumptively Li Daozong

Princess Wencheng (Chinese: 文成公主; pinyin: Wénchéng Gōngzhǔ; Tibetan: མུན་ཆང་ཀོང་ཅོ, Wylie: mun chang kong co) was a princess and member of a minor branch of the imperial clan of the Tang dynasty, who married King Songtsen Gampo of the Tibetan Empire in 641. She is also known by the name Gyasa or "Chinese wife" in Tibet. Both Wencheng and Songtsen Gampo's first wife, Nepali princess Bhrikuti, are considered to be physical manifestations of the bodhisattvas White Tara and Green Tara respectively.

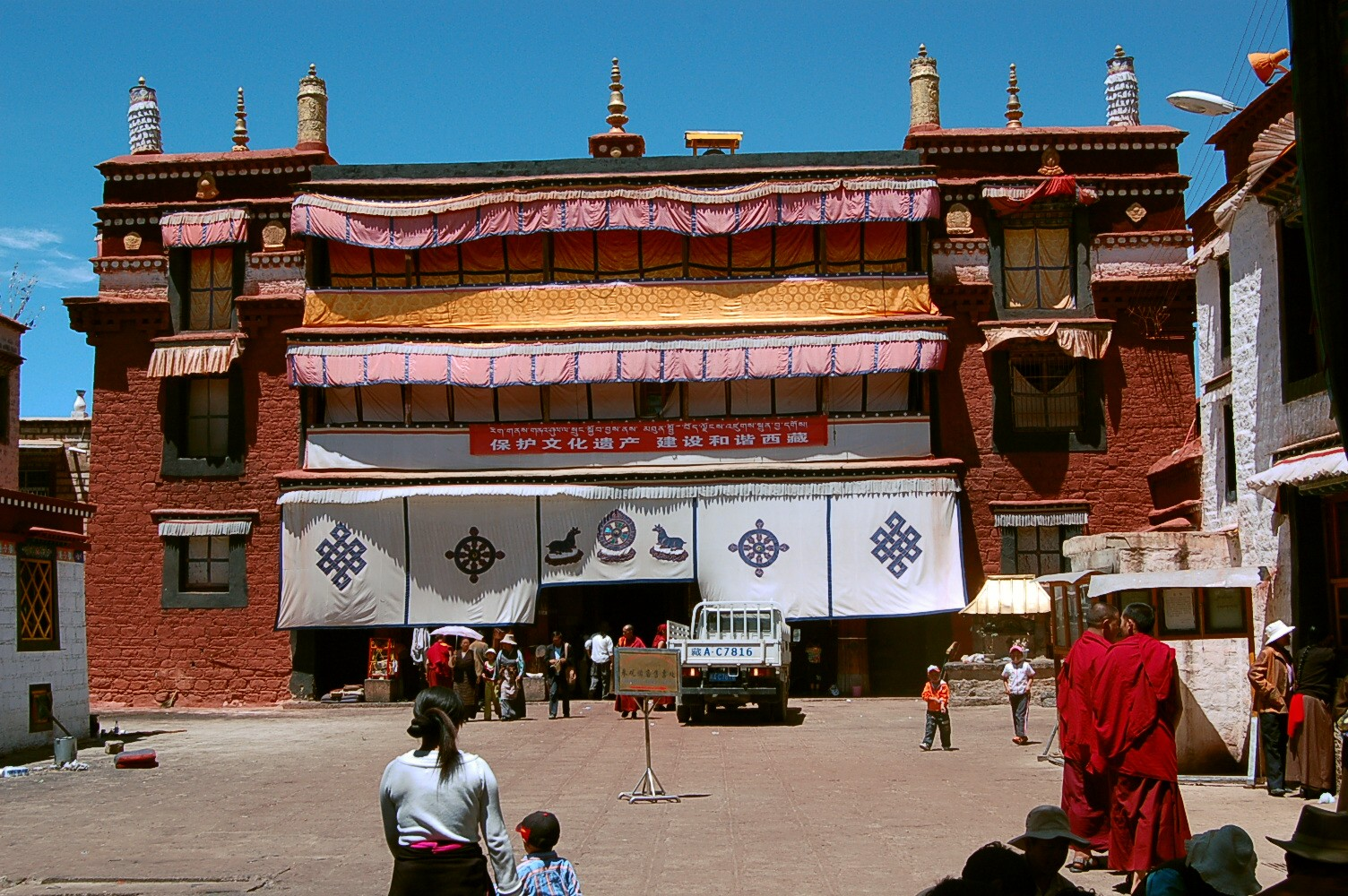
Ramoche Gonpa, Wencheng's legacy, built originally to house the statue Jowo Shakyamuni Rinpoche

== Marriage proposal ==
In 634, King Songtsen Gampo sent an envoy to Luoyang, the eastern Tang capital. When Songtsen heard that both the Turks and Tuyuhun had marriage alliances with the Tang, he sent an envoy to the Tang capital to make a marriage proposal. The Tang turned it down and the Tibetan envoy told Songtsen that initially the Tang had accepted but the Tuyuhun were responsible for changing their decision. Songtsen attacked the Tuyuhun and the Dangxiang. Following his attack on the Tuyuhun, Songtsen stationed large numbers of troops on the western border of Songzhou in modern Sichuan and demanded a princess in marriage or else he would lead 50,000 troops to attack. In 638, the Tibetans attacked Songzhou and conquered two prefectures but withdrew after Tang counterattacks. Tibetan sources state that they were victorious while Chinese sources say they were victorious. In 640, Songtsen made a marriage proposal to which the Tang accepted in order to prevent further attacks.

In 638, Tang and Tuyuhun envoys arrived in Tibet. Tibetan sources say they came to pay tribute while Chinese sources say Tibet did not object to being a vassal within their tributary system. Thirteen Tibetan missions arrived at the Tang court during this time which were described as tribute missions.

In 641, Princess Wencheng left for Tibet with Gar Tongtsen Yulsung. Both Chinese and Tibetan sources agree that Wencheng was not a daughter of the Chinese emperor.

== Life in Tibet ==
According to the Old Book of Tang, Princess Wencheng was married to Songtsen Gampo. Songtsen received the princess at Bohai Lake. A palace was built for the princess to live in. The princess did not like the Tibetans painting their face red so Songtsen banned this custom. In the Biography of Senior Monks Who Went to Western Regions for Scriptures, written by Jing Yi, a Tang monk, Dharma Master Xuanzhao met the princess while passing through Tibet. She gave him a warm reception.

Tibetan sources describe Princess Wencheng as “Rgya-Mo-Bzav”, literally meaning “the goddess from the Central Empire”.

According to Tibetan history, before entering Tibet, she did a geographical observation and found that Tibet's territory was shaped like Srinmo (an indigenous demoness) lying on her back. Temples were built to suppress the demoness. Princess Wencheng oversaw the construction of the Ramoche Temple. Together with Songtsen's wife from Nepal, Princess Wencheng assisted Songtsen with national affairs and contributed to the development of Buddhism in Tibet.

== Legacy ==
According to the Tibetan history, Songtsen Gampo's and Princess Wencheng's union brought hopes of promoting a harmonious, matrimonial relationship between the peoples of Tibet and China.

Princess Wencheng's life is depicted in texts such as the Maṇi bka' 'bum and the famed historiographies of Rgyal rabs Gsal ba'i Me long.

Tradruk Temple in Nêdong commemorates Princess Wencheng: a thangka embroidered by the Princess is kept in one of its chapels.

=== In literature ===
In the first narrative, which is from Chinese classical literature, Princess Wencheng was treated as an insignificant figure and the text paid much more attention to the ceremony of the “peace-making marriage” than to the princess's individual traits.

In the second narrative, which is from ancient Tibetan literature, the princess was portrayed as the incarnation of “White Tara”, a female deity in Tibetan Buddhism, and supposedly possessed goddess qualities.

The third narrative, which was shaped by the Republic of China nationalist discourse beginning c.1928 depicted a "re-imagined" history and image of Princess Wencheng. The re-imagined image gradually transformed her into a “transmitter of technology.”

=== In legends ===
The seated statue of Sakyamuni brought by Princess Wencheng is enshrined in the Jokhang.

According to legend, Rishan and Yueshan (Riyue Mountain) were transformed by the precious mirror of Princess Wencheng. Princess Wencheng walked to the dividing line between Tang and Tubo, and threw the Sun and Moon Mirror given by her parents behind her to cut off the endless thoughts of her relatives.

Legend has it that when Princess Wencheng and her party went to Lhasa by way of Chaya, they made a short stop in the beautiful Renda. According to the legend, Princess Wencheng commissioned nine Buddha images, including one of the Great Sun Tathagata, on Danma Cliff. The princess also plans to build a temple here. However, although there are towering mountains in this area, there is not a single tree. The legend states that the princess used supernatural powers to cause a forest to grow on the mountain. So the local people cut down the trees and built the Renda Hall. At the same time, the princess also taught the locals to open up wasteland and farm fields, divert water for irrigation, and use water mills. The site later became a place of Buddhist worship, where visitors offered incense and prayers.

== Modern culture ==
Since the 2000s, the Chinese state has been presenting an opera in Lhasa which features Princess Wencheng. The opera is presented 180 times a year, both in a theatre or outside on a plaza. According to many observers, the opera misrepresents Tibetan Buddhism, the Tibetan Empire era, and Tibet's historically independent relationship with China.

The work "Princess Wencheng" was written by Zhang Minghe, a famous Chinese lyricist. From when Princess Wencheng first entered Tibet to the life of the Tibetan people, to her being praised and sung by the Tibetan people.

== References and further reading ==
- Beckwith, Christopher I. (1987). The Tibetan Empire in Central Asia. Princeton: Princeton University Press.
- Dowman, Keith (1988). The Power-places of Central Tibet: The Pilgrim's Guide. London and New York: Routledge & Kegan Paul. ISBN 0-7102-1370-0.
- Helman-Wazny, Agnieszka (2016). "Overview of Tibetan Paper and Papermaking: History, Raw Materials, Techniques and Fibre Analysis". In Orna Almogi (ed.). Tibetan Manuscript and Xylograph Traditions.
- Jay, Jennifer W. (2014). "Li, Princess Wencheng". In Lee, Lily Xiao Hong; Wiles, Sue (eds.). Biographical Dictionary of Chinese Women: Tang Through Ming, 618–1644. M.E. Sharpe. pp. 204–205. ISBN 978-0-7656-4316-2.
- Laird, Thomas (2007). The Story of Tibet: Conversations with the Dalai Lama. Grove Press. ISBN 978-0-8021-4327-3.
- Peterson, Barbara Bennett (2000). Notable Women of China. M.E. Sharpe. doi:10.4324/9781315702063. ISBN 978-0-7656-1929-7.
- Powers, John (2004). History As Propaganda : Tibetan Exiles versus the People's Republic of China: Tibetan Exiles versus the People's Republic of China. Oxford University Press. ISBN 978-0-19-803884-9.
- Richardson, Hugh Edward (1965). "How Old was Srong Brtsan Sgampo" (PDF). Bulletin of Tibetology. 1 (2): 5–9.
- —— (1985). A Corpus of Early Tibetan Inscriptions. London: Psychology Press. ISBN 978-0-947593-00-1.
- —— (1997). "Mun Sheng Kong Co and Kim Sheng Kong Co: Two Chinese Princesses in Tibet". The Tibet Journal. 22 (1): 3–11.
- Slobodník, Martin (2006). "The Chinese Princess Wencheng in Tibet: A Cultural Intermediary between Facts and Myth". In Gálik, M.; Štefanovičová, T. (eds.). Trade, Journeys, Inner- and Intercultural Communication in East and West (up to 1250). Bratislava: Lufema. pp. 267–276.
- Warner, Cameron David (2011). "A Prolegomenon to the Palladium of Tibet, the Jowo (Jo bo) Śākyamuni". In Bue, Erberto Lo (ed.). Proceedings of the Tenth Seminar of the IATS, 2003. Volume 13: Art in Tibet: Issues in Traditional Tibetan Art from the Seventh to the Twentieth Century. BRILL. pp. 3–17. ISBN 978-90-04-15519-0.
