= Jokhang =

Tibetan Buddhist monastery in Lhasa, Tibet, China

- Tibetan transcription(s); Tibetan: ཇོ་ཁང། Chinese transcription(s); Pinyin: Dàzhāosì
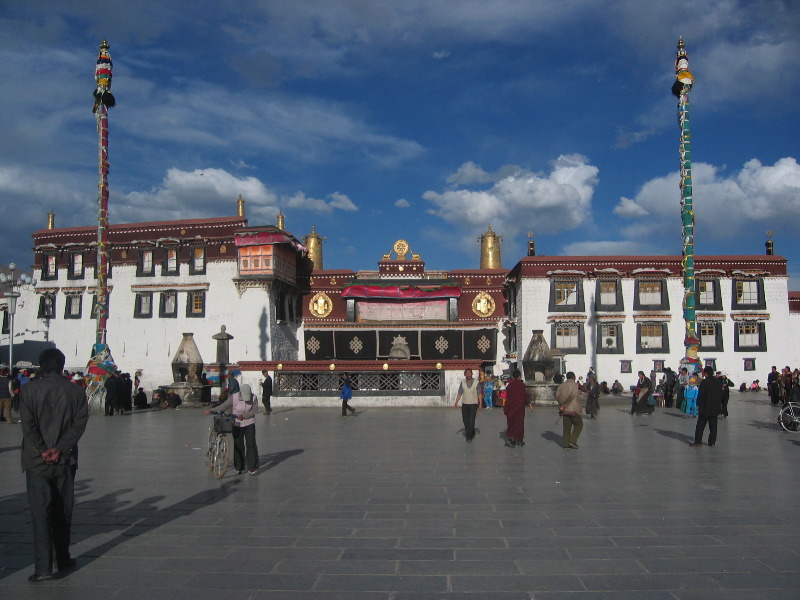
- The Jokhang, with Barkhor Square in front

- Location in Tibet Autonomous Region

Religion
- Affiliation: Tibetan Buddhism
- Sect: Gelug
- Deity: Shakyamuni; home of the most-venerated statue in Tibet

Location
- Location: Barkhor, Lhasa, Tibet Autonomous Region
- Country: China

Architecture
- Style: Vihara, Tibetan, Nepalese
- Founder: Songtsen Gampo
- Established: 652; 1374 years ago
- Location within Tibet Location within China

UNESCO World Heritage Site
- Official name: Jokhang Temple Monastery
- Part of: Historic Ensemble of the Potala Palace, Lhasa
- Criteria: Cultural: (i), (iv), (vi)
- Reference: 707ter-002
- Inscription: 1994 (18th Session)
- Extensions: 2000, 2001
- Area: 7.5 ha (810,000 sq ft)
- Buffer zone: 130 ha (14,000,000 sq ft)
- Coordinates: 29°39′11″N 91°2′51″E

The Jokhang (Tibetan: ཇོ་ཁང།, Chinese: 大昭寺), historically known as the Rasa Trulnang (ra sa 'phrul snang) or Qoikang Monastery or Zuglagkang (Tibetan: གཙུག་ལག་ཁང༌།, Wylie: gtsug-lag-khang, ZWPY: Zuglagkang or Tsuklakang), is considered the "heart of Lhasa". The Jokhang consists of a Tibetan Buddhist temple, its temple complex, and a Gelug school monastery. Located in Barkhor Square, it was built in c.640 by King Songsten Gampo to house the Jowo Mikyo Dorje, a statue of Akshobhya Buddha, brought to Tibet by his Nepalese queen, Bhrikuti. Another statue, the Jowo Shakyamuni, brought by his Tang Chinese queen Wencheng, is currently housed in the temple and the Jowo Mikyo Dorje is housed in the Ramoche, in Lhasa.

Many Nepalese and Indian artists and craftsmen worked on the temple's original design and construction. Around the 14th century, the temple was associated with the Vajrasana in India. In the 18th century the Qianlong Emperor of the Qing dynasty, following the Nepalese Gorkha invasion of Tibet in 1792, did not allow the Nepalese to visit this temple and it became an exclusive place of worship for the Tibetans. Early into the Cultural Revolution, the Red Guards attacked the Jokhang temple in 1966 and for a decade there was no worship. Renovation of the Jokhang took place from 1972 to 1980. In 2000, the Jokhang became a UNESCO World Heritage Site as an extension of the Potala Palace, which has been a World Heritage Site since 1994. After its UNESCO status was conferred, PRC China redeveloped parts of the World Heritage Sites in Lhasa, and the Barkhor Square in front of the temple was partially demolished and encroached upon.

== Location ==
The temple, considered the "spiritual heart of the city" and the most sacred in Tibet, is at the center of an ancient network of Buddhist temples in Lhasa. It is the focal point of commercial activity in the city, with a maze of streets radiating from it. The Jokhang is 1,000 metres (3,300 ft) east of the Potala Palace. Barkhor, the market square in central Lhasa, has a walkway for pilgrims to walk around the temple (which takes about 20 minutes). Barkhor Square is marked by four stone sankang (incense burners), two of which are in front of the temple and two in the rear.

== Etymology ==
Rasa Thrulnag Tsuklakhang ("House of Mysteries" or "House of Religious Science") was the Jokhang's ancient name. When King Songtsen Gampo built the temple, his capital city was known as Rasa ("Goats"), since goats were used to move earth during its construction. After the king's death, the city became known as Lhasa (Place of the Gods). Later, the temple was called the Jokhang —"House of the Jowo"— derived from Jowo Mikyo Dorje, its primary image. The Jokhang's Chinese name is Dazhao (Monastery of Great Distinction); it is also known as Zuglagkang, Qoikang Monastery Tsuglakhang (Chapel of Jowo Śākyamuni) and Tsuglhakhange.

== History ==
King Songtsen Gampo (the first king of a unified Tibet) developed a plan to build twelve temples across the country. The temples were built in three stages. In the first stage central Tibet was covered with four temples, known as the "four horns" (ru bzhi). Four more temples, (mtha'dul), were built in the outer areas in the second stage; the last four, the yang'dul, were built on the country's frontiers. The Jokhang temple was finally built in the heart of Tibet.

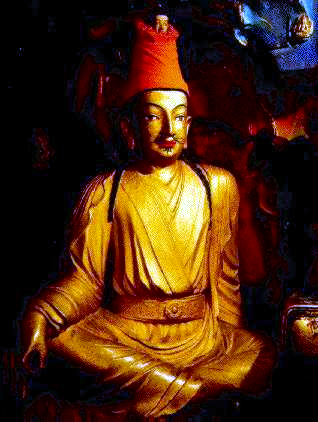
King Songtsen Gampo

To forge ties with neighboring Nepal, Songtsen Gampo sent envoys to King Amsuvarman seeking his daughter's hand in marriage and the king accepted. His daughter, Bhrikuti, came to Tibet as the king's Nepalese wife (tritsun; belsa in Tibetan). The image of Akshobhya Buddha known as Jowo Mikyo Dorje (or Mikyoba), which she had brought as part of her dowry, was deified in the Jokhang.

Songsten Gampo, wishing to obtain a wife from China, sent his ambassador to Emperor Taizong (627–650) of the Tang dynasty for one of his daughters. Taizong rejected the king's proposal, considering Tibetans "barbarians", and announced the marriage of one of his daughters to the king of Tuyuhun. This infuriated Songsten Gampo, who mounted attacks on tribal areas affiliated with the Tang dynasty and then attacked the Tang city of Songzhou. Telling the emperor that he would escalate his aggression unless the emperor agreed to his proposal, Songsten Gampo sent a conciliatory gift of a gold-studded "suit of armour" with another request for marriage. Taizong conceded, giving Princess Wencheng to the Tibetan king. When Wencheng went to Tibet in 640 as the Chinese wife of the king (known as Gyasa in Tibet), she brought an image of Sakyamuni Buddha, as a young prince. The image was deified in Ramoche temple in Lhasa. It was later moved to the Jokhang. The temple remains the holiest shrine in Tibet and the image, known as Jowo Rinpoche, has become the country's most-revered statue.

The oldest part of the temple was built in 652 by Songtsen Gampo. To find a location for the temple, the king reportedly tossed his hat (a ring in another version) ahead of him with a promise to build a temple where the hat landed. It landed in a lake, where a white stupa (memorial monument) suddenly emerged over which the temple was built. In another version of the legend, Queen Bhrikuti founded the temple to install the statue she had brought. The lake was filled, leaving a small pond now visible as a well fed by the ancient lake, and a temple was built on the filled area. Over the next nine centuries, the temple was enlarged; its last renovation was carried out in 1610 by the Fifth Dalai Lama.

The temple's design and construction are attributed to Nepalese craftsmen. After Songtsen Gampo's death, Queen Wencheng reportedly moved the statue of Jowo from the Ramoche temple to the Jokhang temple to secure it from Chinese attack. The part of the temple known as the Chapel was the hiding place of the Jowo Sakyamuni.

During the reign of King Tresang Detsan from 755 to 797, Buddhists were persecuted because the king's minister, Marshang Zongbagyi (a devotee of Bon), was hostile to Buddhism. During this time the image of Akshobya Buddha in the Jokhang temple was hidden underground, reportedly 200 people failed to locate it. The images in the Jokhang and Ramoche temples were moved to Jizong in Ngari, and the monks were persecuted and driven from Jokhang. During the anti-Buddhist activity of the late ninth and early tenth centuries, the Jokhang and Ramoche temples were said to be used as stables. In 1049 Atisha, a renowned teacher of Buddhism from Bengal who taught in Jokhang and died in 1054, found the "Royal Testament of the Pillar" (Bka' chems ka khol ma) in a pillar at Jokhang; the document was said to be the testament of Songtsen Gampo.

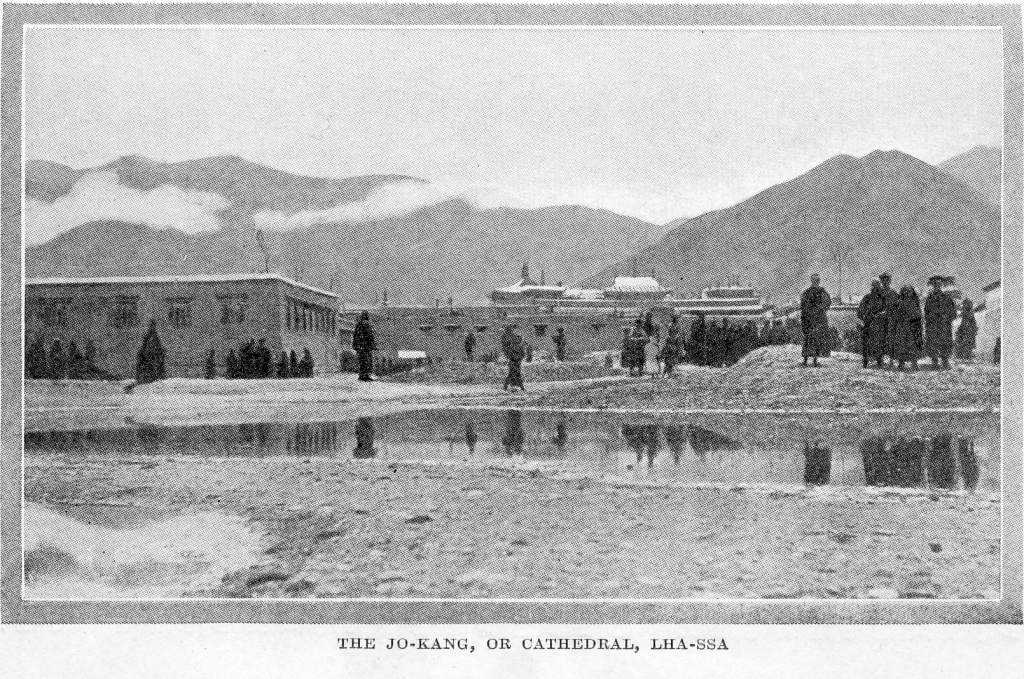
Jokhang in the mid-1840s

Beginning in about the 14th century, the temple was associated with the Vajrasana in India. It is said that the image of Buddha deified in the Jokhang is the 12-year-old Buddha earlier located in the Bodh Gaya Temple in India, indicating "historical and ritual" links between India and Tibet. Tibetans call Jokhang the "Vajrasana of Tibet" (Bod yul gyi rDo rje gdani), the "second Vajrasana" (rDo rje gdan pal) and "Vajrasan, the navel of the land of snow" (Gangs can sa yi lte ba rDo rje gdani).

After the occupation of Nepal by the Gorkhas in 1769, during the Gorkha-Tibetan war in 1792 the Qianlong Emperor of the Qing dynasty drove the Gorkhas from Tibet and the Tibetans were isolated from their neighbors. The period, lasting for more than a century, has been called "the Dark Age of Tibet". Pilgrimages outside the country were forbidden for Tibetans, and the Qianlong Emperor suggested that it would be equally effective to worship the Jowo Buddha at the Jokhang.

In Chinese development of Lhasa, Barkhor Square was encroached when the walkway around the temple was destroyed. An inner walkway was converted into a plaza, leaving only a short walkway as a pilgrimage route. In the square, religious objects related to the pilgrimage are sold.

During the Cultural Revolution, Red Guards attacked the Jokhang in 1966, starting on August 24, and for a decade there was no worship in Tibetan monasteries. Renovation of the Jokhang began in 1972, and was mostly complete by 1980. After this and the end of persecution, the temple was re-consecrated. It is now visited by a large number of Tibetans, who come to worship Jowo in the temple's inner sanctum. During the Revolution, the temple was spared destruction and was reportedly boarded up until 1979. At that time, portions of the Jokhang reportedly housed pigs, a slaughterhouse and Chinese army barracks. Soldiers burned historic Tibetan scriptures. For a time, it was a hotel.

Two flagstone doring (inscribed pillars) outside the temple, flanking its north and south entrances, are worshiped by Tibetans. The first monument, a March 1794 edict known as the "Forever Following Tablet" in Chinese, records advice on hygiene to prevent smallpox; some has been chiseled out by Tibetans who believed that the stone itself had curative powers. The second, far older, pillar is 5.5 metres (18 ft) high with a crown in the shape of a palace and an inscription dated 821 or 822. The tablet has a number of names; "Number One Tablet in Asia", "Lhasa Alliance Tablet", "Changing Alliance Tablet", "Uncle and Nephew Alliance Tablet" and the "Tang Dynasty-Tubo Peace Alliance Tablet". Its inscription, in Tibetan and Chinese, is a treaty between the Tibetan king Ralpacan and the Chinese emperor Muzong delineating the boundary between their countries. Both inscriptions were enclosed by brick walls when Barkhor Square was developed in 1985. The Sino-Tibetan treaty reads, "Tibet and China shall abide by the frontiers of which they are now in occupation. All to the east is the country of Great China; and all to the west is, without question, the country of Great Tibet. Henceforth on neither side shall there be waging of war nor seizing of territory. If any person incurs suspicion he shall be arrested; his business shall be inquired into and he shall be escorted back".

According to the Dalai Lama, among the many images in the temple was an image of Chenrizi, made of clay in the temple, within which the small wooden statue of the Buddha brought from Nepal was hidden. The image was in the temple for 1300 years, and when Songtsen Gampo died his soul was believed to have entered the small wooden statue. During the Cultural Revolution, the clay image was smashed and the smaller Buddha was given by a Tibetan to the Dalai Lama.

In 2000, the Jokhang became a UNESCO World Heritage Site as an extension of the Potala Palace (a World Heritage Site since 1994) to facilitate conservation efforts. The temple is listed in the first group of National Cultural Protection Relic Units, and has been categorized as a 4A-level tourist site.

On February 17, 2018, the temple caught fire at 6:40 p.m. (local time), before sunset in Lhasa, with the blaze lasting until late that evening. Although photos and videos about the fire were spread on Chinese social media, which showed the eaved roof of a section of the building lit with roaring yellow flames and emitting a haze of smoke, these images were quickly censored and disappeared. The official newspaper Tibet Daily briefly claimed online that the fire was "quickly extinguished" with "no deaths or injuries" at the late night, while The People's Daily published the same words online and added that there had been "no damage to relics" in the temple; both of these reports contained no photos. The temple was temporarily closed after the fire but were reopened to public on February 18.

== Architecture ==
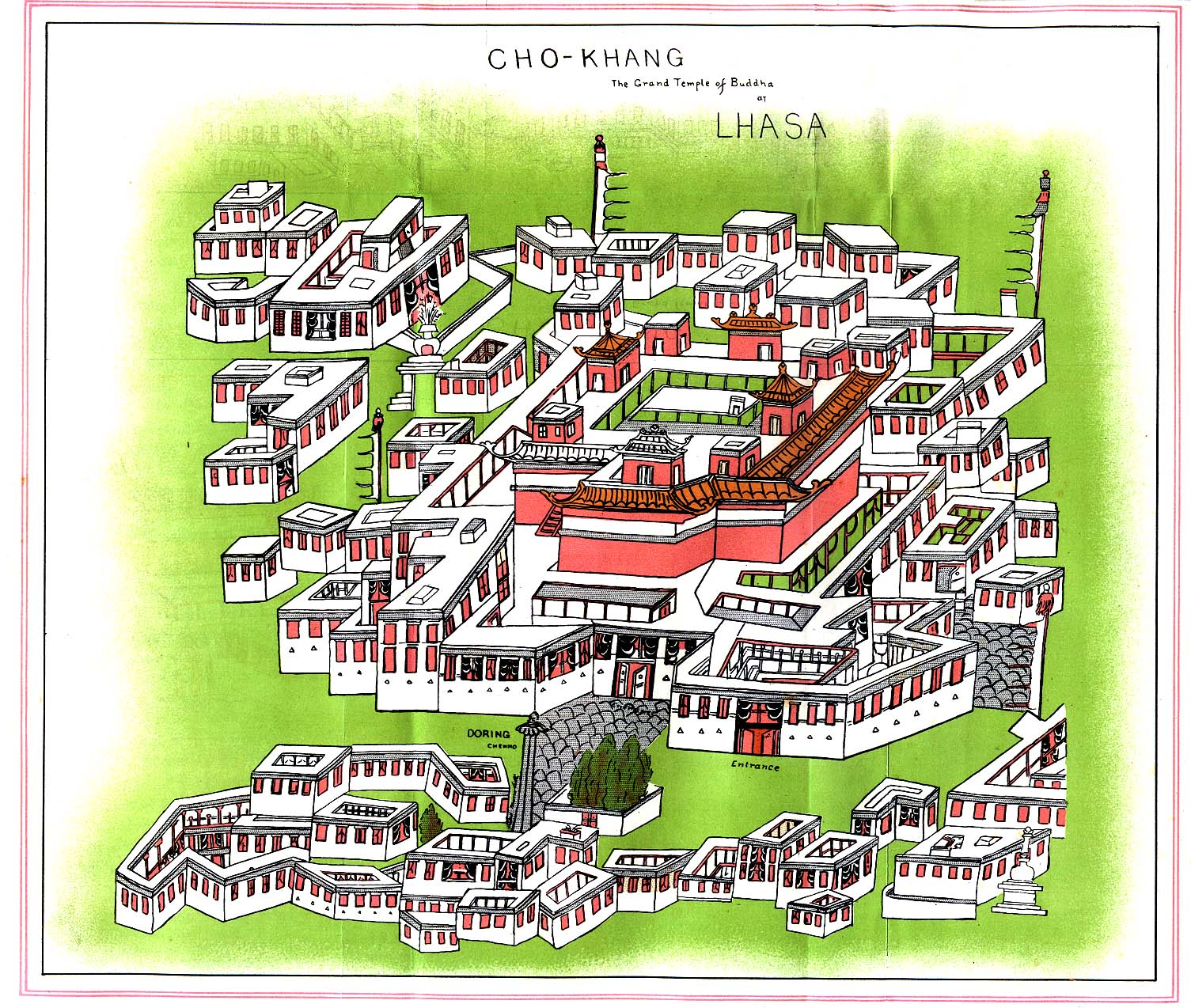
Plan of the complex from Journey to Lhasa and Central Tibet by Sarat Chandra Das, 1902

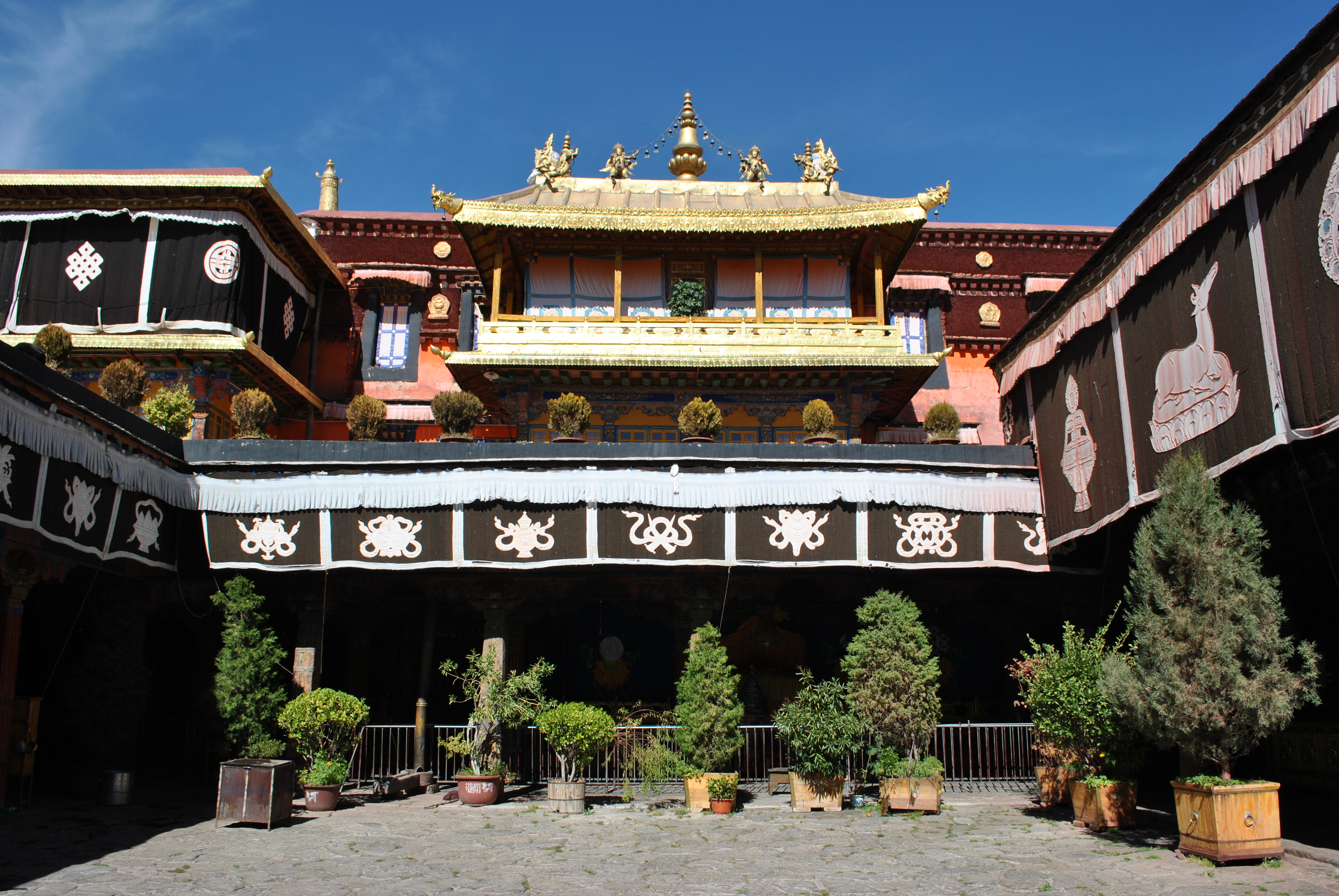
Jokhang temple courtyard, 2013

The Jokhang temple covers an area of 2.51 hectares (6.2 acres). When it was built during the seventh century, it had eight rooms on two floors to house scriptures and sculptures of the Buddha. The temple had brick-lined floors, columns and door frames and carvings made of wood. During the Tubo period, there was conflict between followers of Buddhism and the indigenous Bon religion. Changes in dynastic rule affected the Jokhang Monastery; after 1409, during the Ming dynasty, many improvements were made to the temple. The second and third floors of the Buddha Hall and the annex buildings were built during the 11th century. The main hall is the four-story Buddha Hall.

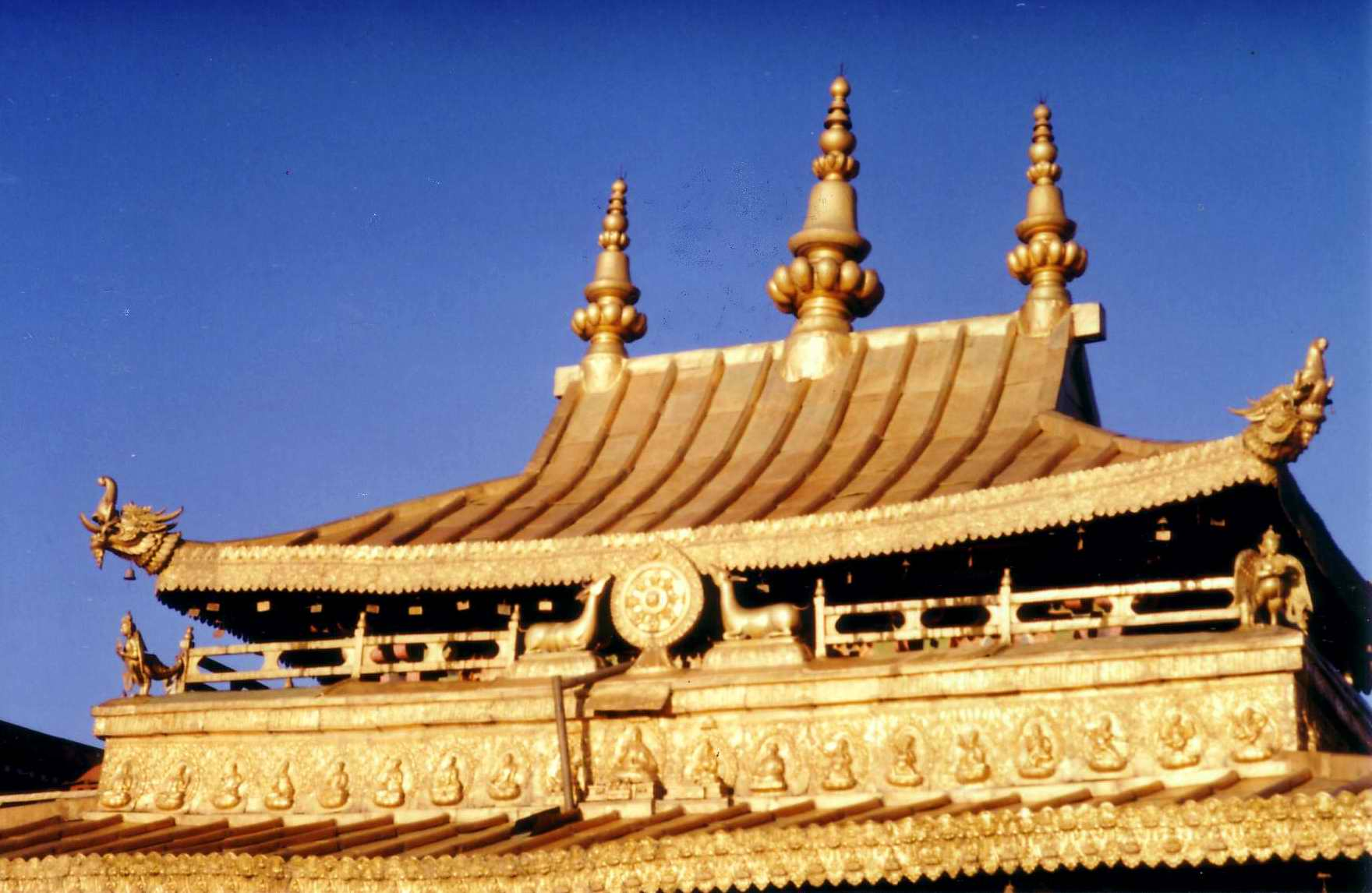
Gilt roof of the Jokhang

The temple has an east-west orientation, facing Nepal to the west in honour of Princess Bhrikuti. Additionally, the monastery's main gate faces west. The Jokhang is aligned along an axis, beginning with an arch gate and followed by the Buddha Hall, an enclosed passage, a cloister, atriums and a hostel for the lamas (monks). Inside the entrance are four "Guardian Kings" (Chokyong), two on each side. The main shrine is on the ground floor. On the first floor are murals, residences for the monks and a private room for the Dalai Lama, and there are residences for the monks and chapels on all four sides of the shrine. The temple is made of wood and stone. Its architecture features the Tibetan Buddhist style, with influences from China, Indian vihara design and Nepal. The roof is covered with gilded bronze tiles, figurines and decorated pavilions.

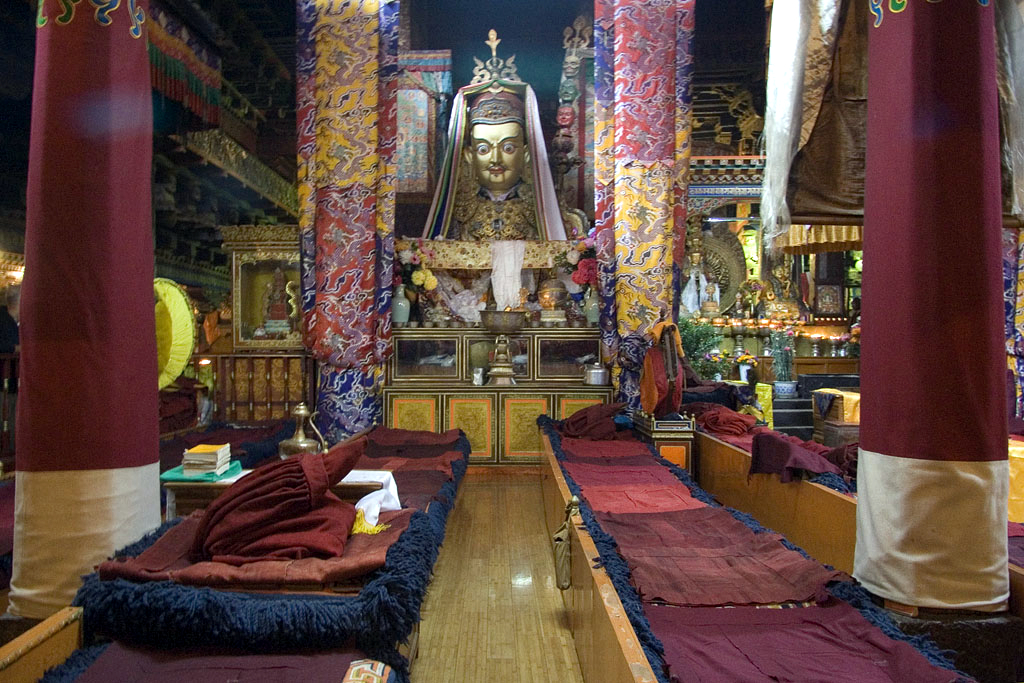
Temple interior

The central Buddha Hall is tall, with a large, paved courtyard. A porch leads to the open courtyard, which is two concentric circles with two temples: one in the outer circle and another in the inner circle. The outer circle has a circular path, with a number of large prayer wheels (nangkhor); this path leads to the main shrine, which is surrounded by chapels. Only one of the temple murals remains, depicting the arrival of Queen Wencheng and an image of the Buddha. The image, brought by the king's Nepalese wife and initially kept at Ramoche, was moved to Jokhang and kept in the rear center of the inner temple. This Buddha has remained on a platform since the eighth century; on a number of occasions, it was moved for safekeeping. The image, amidst those of the king and his two consorts, has been gilded several times. In the main hall on the ground floor is a gilded bronze statue of Jowo Sakyamuni, 1.5 metres (4 ft 11 in) tall, representing the Buddha at age twelve. The image has a bejeweled crown, cover around its shoulder, a diamond on its forehead and wears a pearl-studded garment. The Buddha is seated in a lotus position on a three-tiered lotus throne, with his left hand on his lap and his right hand touching the earth. A number of chapels surround the Jowo Sakayamuni, dedicated to gods and bodhisattvas. The most important bodhisattva here is the Avalokiteshwara, the patron saint of Tibet, with a thousand eyes and a thousand arms. Flanking the main hall are halls for Amitabha (the Buddha of the past) and Qamba (the Buddha of the future). Incarnations of Sakyamuni are enshrined on either side of a central axis, and the Buddha's warrior guard is in the middle of the halls on the left side.

In addition to the main hall and its adjoining halls, on both sides of the Buddha Hall are dozens of 20-square-metre (220 sq ft) chapels. The Prince of Dharma chapel is on the third floor, including sculptures of Songtsen Gampo, Princess Wencheng, Princess Bhrikuti, Gar Tongtsan (the Tabo minister) and Thonmi Sambhota, the inventor of Tibetan script. The halls are surrounded by enclosed walkways.

Decorations of winged apsaras, human and animal figurines, flowers and grasses are carved on the superstructure. Images of sphinxes with a variety of expressions are carved below the roof.

The temple complex has more than 3,000 images of the Buddha and other deities (including an 85-foot (26 m) image of the Buddha) and historical figures, in addition to manuscripts and other objects. The temple walls are decorated with religious and historical murals.

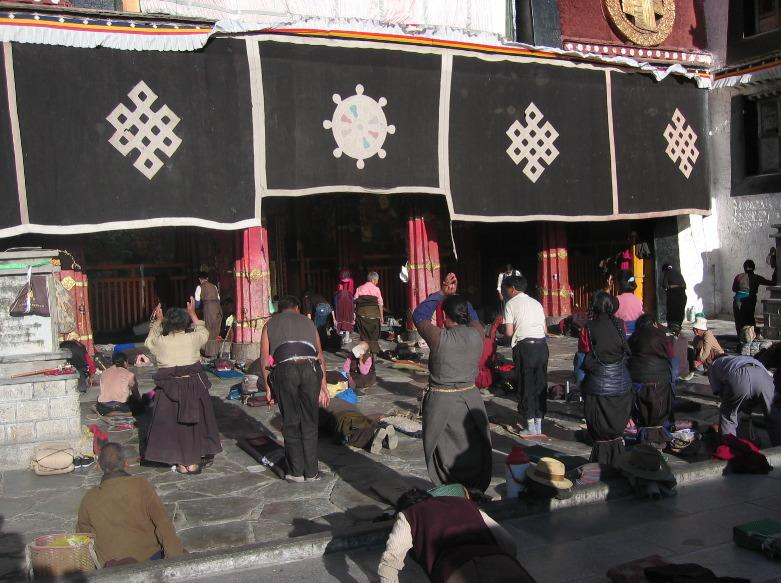
Traditional prayers and prostrations in front of the Jokhang

On the rooftop and roof ridges are iconic statues of golden deer flanking a Dharma wheel, victory flags and monstrous fish. The temple interior is a dark labyrinth of chapels, illuminated by votive candles and filled with incense. Although portions of the temple has been rebuilt, original elements remain. The wooden beams and rafters have been shown by carbon dating to be original, and the Newari door frames, columns and finials dating to the seventh and eighth centuries were brought from the Kathmandu Valley of Nepal.

In addition to walking around the temple and spinning prayer wheels, pilgrims prostrate themselves before approaching the main deity; some crawl a considerable distance to the main shrine. The prayer chanted during this worship is "Om mani padme hum" (Hail to the jewel in the lotus). Pilgrims queue on both sides of the platform to place a ceremonial scarf (katak) around the Buddha's neck or touch the image's knee. A walled enclosure in front of the Jokhang, near the Tang Dynasty-Tubo Peace Alliance Tablet, contains the stump of a willow known as the "Tang Dynasty Willow" or the "Princess Willow". The willow was reportedly planted by Princess Wencheng.

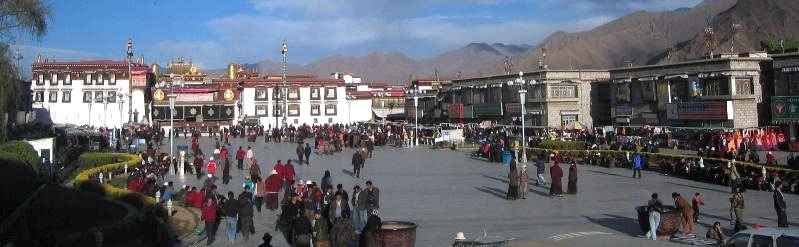
Jokhang Square, the approach to the complex taken by most tourists today

== Buddhist scriptures and sculptures ==
The Jokhang has a sizable, significant collection of cultural artifacts, including Tang-dynasty bronze sculptures and finely-sculpted figures in different shapes from the Ming dynasty. The book 108 Buddhist Statues in Tibet by Ulrich von Schroeder, published in 2008, contains a DVD with digital photographs of the 419 most important Buddhist sculptures in the collection of the Jokhang . Among hundreds of thangkas, two notable paintings of Chakrasamvara and Yamantaka date to the reign of the Yongle Emperor; both are embroidered on silk and well-preserved. The collection also has 54 boxes of Tripiṭaka printed in red, 108 carved sandalwood boxes with sutras and a vase (a gift from the Qianlong Emperor) used to select the Dalai Lama and the Panchen Lama.

== See also ==
- Norbulingka
- Dhvaja
- Tsozong Gongba Monastery
- Sanga Monastery
- List of Tibetan monasteries
- List of Major National Historical and Cultural Sites in Tibet

== Bibliography ==
- An, Caidan (2003). Tibet China: Travel Guide. 五洲传播出版社. ISBN 978-7-5085-0374-5.
- Barnett, Robert (2010). Lhasa: Streets with Memories. Columbia University Press. ISBN 978-0-231-13681-5.
- Barron, Richard (10 February 2003). The Autobiography of Jamgon Kongtrul: A Gem of Many Colors. Snow Lion Publications. ISBN 978-1-55939-970-8.
- Brockman, Norbert C. (13 September 2011). Encyclopedia of Sacred Places. ABC-CLIO. ISBN 978-1-59884-655-3.
- Buckley, Michael (2012). Tibet. Bradt Travel Guides. ISBN 978-1-84162-382-5.
- Dalton, Robert H. (2004). Sacred Places of the World: A Religious Journey Across the Globe. Abhishek. ISBN 978-81-8247-051-4.
- Davidson, Linda Kay; Gitlitz, David Martin (2002). Pilgrimage: From the Ganges to Graceland : an Encyclopedia. ABC-CLIO. ISBN 978-1-57607-004-8.
- Dorje, Gyurme (2010). Jokhang: Tibet's Most Sacred Buddhist Temple. Edition Hansjorg Mayer. ISBN 978-5-00-097692-0.
- Huber, Toni (15 September 2008). The Holy Land Reborn: Pilgrimage and the Tibetan Reinvention of Buddhist India. University of Chicago Press. ISBN 978-0-226-35650-1.
- Jabb, Lama (10 June 2015). Oral and Literary Continuities in Modern Tibetan Literature: The Inescapable Nation. Lexington Books. ISBN 978-1-4985-0334-1.
- Klimczuk, Stephen; Warner, Gerald (2009). Secret Places, Hidden Sanctuaries: Uncovering Mysterious Sites, Symbols, and Societies. Sterling Publishing Company, Inc. ISBN 978-1-4027-6207-9.
- Laird, Thomas (10 October 2007). The Story of Tibet: Conversations with the Dalai Lama. Grove Press. ISBN 978-0-8021-4327-3.
- Mayhew, Bradley; Kelly, Robert; Bellezza, John Vincent (2008). Tibet. Ediz. Inglese. Lonely Planet. ISBN 978-1-74104-569-7.
- McCue, Gary (1 March 2011). Trekking Tibet. The Mountaineers Books. ISBN 978-1-59485-411-8.
- Perkins, Dorothy (19 November 2013). Encyclopedia of China: History and Culture. Taylor & Francis. ISBN 978-1-135-93569-6.
- Powers, John (25 December 2007). Introduction to Tibetan Buddhism. Snow Lion Publications. ISBN 978-1-55939-835-0.
- Representatives, Australia. Parliament. House of (1994). Parliamentary Debates Australia: House of Representatives. Commonwealth Government Printer.
- Service, United States. Foreign Broadcast Information (1983). Daily Report: People's Republic of China. National Technical Information Service.
- von Schroeder, Ulrich. 2001. Buddhist Sculptures in Tibet. Vol. One: India & Nepal; Vol. Two: Tibet & China. (Volume One: 655 pages with 766 illustrations; Volume Two: 675 pages with 987 illustrations). Hong Kong: Visual Dharma Publications, Ltd. ISBN 962-7049-07-7
- von Schroeder, Ulrich. 2008. 108 Buddhist Statues in Tibet. (212 p., 112 colour illustrations) (DVD with 527 digital photographs mostly of Jokhang Bronzes). Chicago: Serindia Publications. ISBN 962-7049-08-5
