= Jowo (statue) =

Two 7th-century Tibetan Buddhist statues

The two Jowo Statues are the Jowo Mikyo Dorje of Akshobhya Buddha, and the Jowo Shakyamuni Rinpoche (Tibetan: ཇོ་བོ་རིན་པོ་ཆེ།, Wylie: jo bo rin po che) of Shakyamuni Buddha. The Jowo Mikyo Dorje was brought from Bodhgaya to Nepal, where it stayed in Swayambhunath at Kimdol Vihar. It was then brought to Tibet c. 622, by the Nepali princess Bhrikuti, who is credited with the spread of Buddhism to Tibet. The Jowo Mikyo Dorje was placed in the Jokhang Temple, or the Rasa Trulnag, which was purpose built in c. 640 for the statue.

The Jowo Shakyamuni Rinpoche was brought to Tibet later by the Tang Chinese princess Wencheng, and is a large 7th-century statue of Gautama Buddha for which the Ramoche was built.

Both Jowo statues influenced the tradition of Tibetan art and are among the most sacred statues in Tibet. The locations of the statues were switched, and the Jowo Shakyamuni is housed in the Jokhang chapel of the Rasa Trulnang, the Tsuklakhang Temple, and the Jowo Mikyo Dorje is in the Ramoche, both in Lhasa.

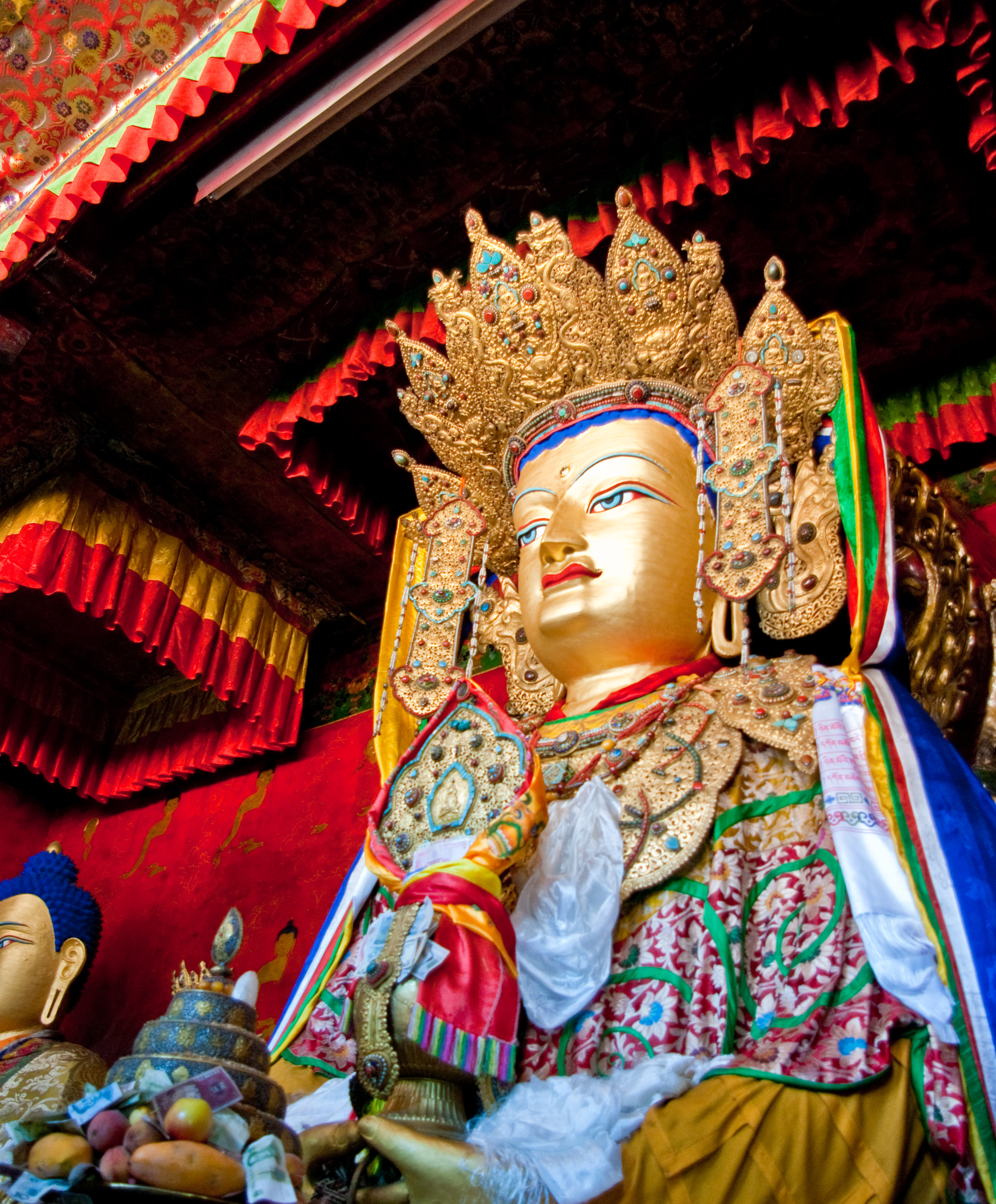
Jowo Mikyo Dorje

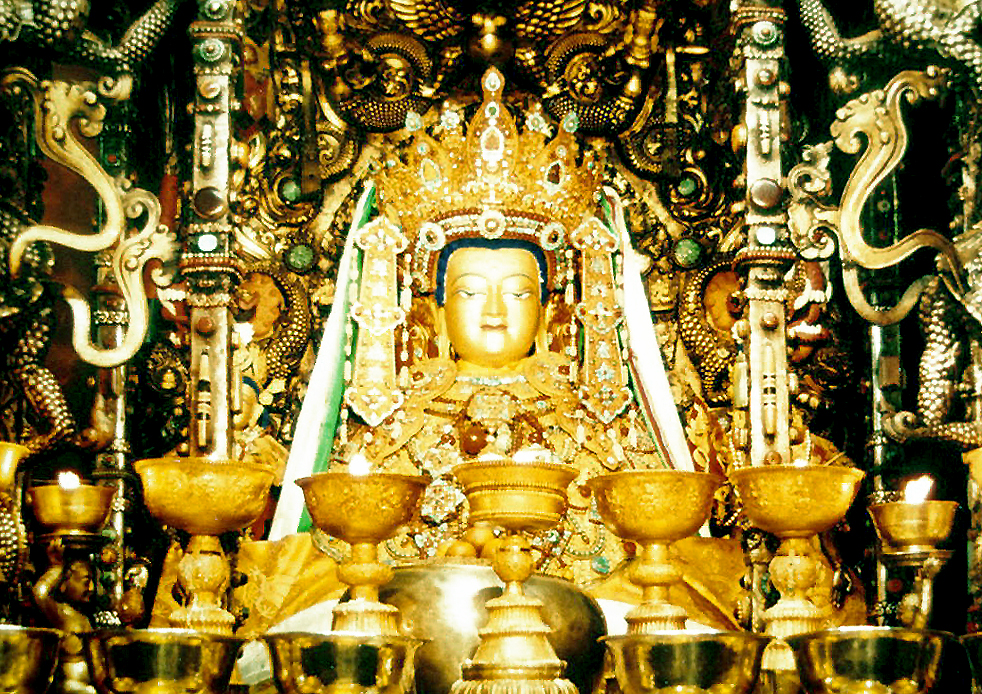
Jowo Shakyamuni Rinpoche

== History ==
The Jowo Rinpoche has a long history. According to Tibetan legend, the Buddha Shakyamuni requested the divine craftsman to create a proxy of him destined eventually for Tibet. It came to be owned by the king of Magadha, who gave it to a Tang emperor of China. A daughter of one of the emperor's clansman's, Wenchen Kongjo, took it to Lhasa via Lhagang as part of her dowry when she became a foreign consort of the 33rd Tibetan king Songtsen Gampo. During Mangsong Mangtsen's reign (649–676), because of a threat that the Tang Chinese might invade and steal the Jowo, Princess Wencheng was said to have hidden the Jowo Rinpoche in a secret chamber in the Tsuglakhang. A subsequent princess from China had it placed in the central chapel of the Jokhang, sometime after 710 CE. It was replaced at Ramoche by a statue of Jowo Mikyo Dorje, a small bronze statue of the Buddha when he was eight years old, crafted by Vishvakarman, and brought to Lhasa by the Nepalese queen, Bhrikuti. Jowo Mikyo Dorje was badly damaged by the Red Guards during the Cultural Revolution.

The Ramoche temple was gutted and partially destroyed in the 1960s and the bronze statue disappeared. In 1983, the lower part of it was said to have been found in a Lhasa rubbish heap, and the upper half in Beijing. They have been joined and the statue is housed in the Ramoche Temple, which was partially restored in 1986, and still showed severe damage in 1993.

The restoration of the Jowo Mikyö Dorje was possible after Ribur Rinpoche (1923–2006), a lama who was jailed by the Chinese Army in 1959 for 20 years in Lhasa, was released in 1979 under the liberalization politics of Deng Xiaoping and granted a position at the Office of Religious Affairs of Tibet. He began attempts to bring back objects considered sacred treasures that had been taken to China. In 1983, with the help of the 10th Panchen Lama, he found the upper part of Jowo Mikyö Dorje and returned it to Tibet. The Panchen Lama said to the Chinese government the Jowos was sacred for Tibetans and that their response to the quest of Ribur Rinpoche would help to prove the sincerity of the new Chinese religious policies.

== Literature ==
- Warner, Cameron David. 2008. "The Precious Lord: The History and Practice of the Cult of the Jowo Śākyamuni in Lhasa, Tibet." Ph.D. Dissertation, Department of Sanskrit and Indian Studies, Harvard University.
- Warner, Cameron David. 2011. "Re/crowning the Jowo Śākyamuni: Texts, Photographs, and Memories." History of Religions 51 (1): 1-30.
- Warner, Cameron David. 2011. "The Genesis of Tibet's First Buddha Images: An Annotated Translation from Three Editions of 'The Vase-shaped Pillar Testament (Bka' chems ka khol ma)'." Light of Wisdom 1 (1): 33–45.
