= Bhrikuti =

Nepali princess, Tibetan queen

Bhrikuti भृकुटी བལ་མོ་བཟ་ཁྲི་བཙུན་
- Tsenmo
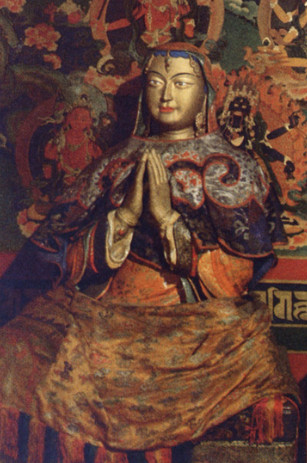
- Bhrikuti Devi

Queen consort of Tibet
- Tenure: 622 – 649 along with consorts Wencheng, Rithigman, Shyalmotsun, Pogong Mangsa Tricham
- Born: 7th century Nepal
- Died: 7th century Tibet
- Spouse: Songtsen Gampo

Bhrikuti Devi (Sanskrit: भृकुटी देवी), known to the Tibetans as Bal-mo-bza' Khri-btsun, Bhelsa Tritsun ("Besa" Nepal lit. 'Nepali consort') or simply Khri-btsun (lit. 'royal lady'), was a Nepali princess from the Licchavi dynasty, and the first queen of King Songtsen Gampo, King of Tibet from c. 622. Bhrikuti was seen as an incarnation of Green Tara, credited for bringing Buddhism to Tibet, together with the Jowo Mikyo Dorje statue for which the Jokhang in Lhasa was built.

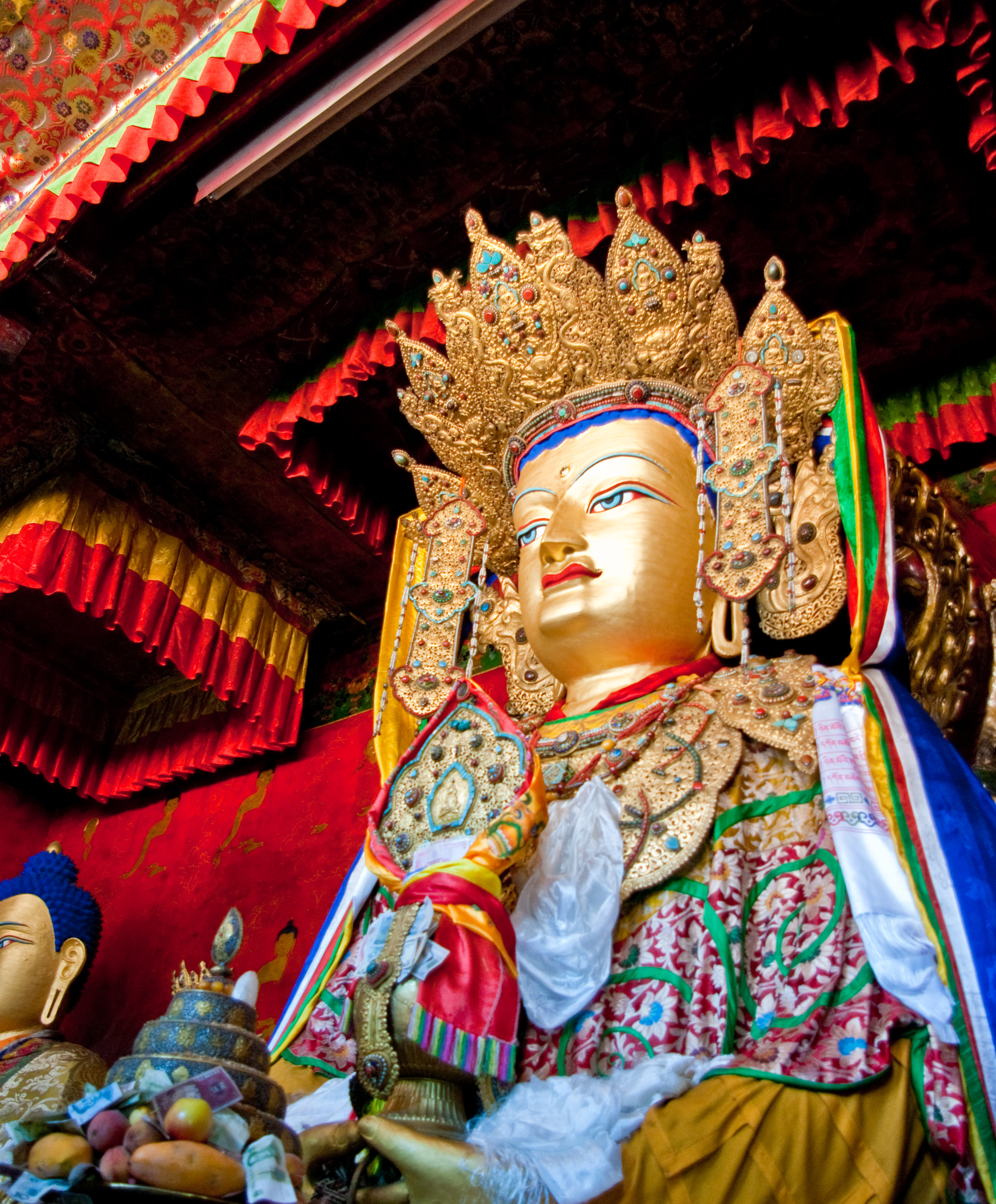
Jowo Mikyo Dorje moved to the Ramoche Temple

== Life ==
Even though the historicity of Bhrikuti Devi is not certain, and no reference to her has been found among the documents discovered at Dunhuang, "there are increasing indications supporting this hypothesis." There were certainly very close relationships between Tibet and Nepal at this period and, "Such a mythological interpretation discredits in no way the historical likelihood of such a marriage...."

Many Tibetan accounts make Bhrikuti the daughter of Amshuvarma (605–621 CE), co-ruler and successor of Śivadeva I. If this is correct, the marriage to Songtsen Gampo must have taken place sometime before 624 CE. Acharya Kirti Tulku Lobsang Tenzin, however, states that Songtsen Gampo married Bhrkuti Devi, the daughter of king "Angsu Varma" or Amshuvarma (Tib: Waser Gocha) of Nepal in 632.

According to some Tibetan legends, however, a Nepali king named Go Cha (identified by Sylvain Lévi as "Udayavarman", from the literal meaning of the Tibetan name) was said to have a daughter called Bri-btumn or Bhṛkuti.

"Udayavarman" was most likely the same king we know as Udayadeva, the son of Śivadeva I and later, the adopted son and heir to Aṃshuvarmā. He was also thought to be the father of Narendradeva (Tib: Miwang-Lha). If this is accepted, it means that Narendradeva and Bhrikuti Devi were brother and sister.

We do have some fairly detailed historical accounts of Narendradeva. The (Jiu) Tangshu, or Old Book of Tang, records that when the king of Nepal, the father of Licchavi king Naling Deva (or Narendradeva), died, an uncle (Yu.sna kug.ti = Vishnagupta) usurped the throne. "The Tibetans gave him [Narendradeva] refuge and reestablished him on his throne [in 641]; that is how he became subject to Tibet."

It is not known exactly when Bhrikuti married Songtsen Gampo, but it was presumably about the time that Narendradeva fled to Tibet (c. 621 CE), following Dhruvadeva's take-over of the throne (who, according to an inscription dated in 623, was ruling jointly with Jiṣṇugupta.)

== Bhrikuti in Tibet ==
This is considered to be the oldest copy of the famous traditional history, the Testament of Ba, states:

"Then during the reign of Songtsen Gampo, after his marriage with Bhrikuti, the daughter of the king of Nepal, the temple (gtsug lag khang) of Rasa [Lhasa] Pe har gling was built. Furthermore, the construction of the forty-two temples of the Ru bzhi was requested and the Brag lha [temple] was built. 'Thonmi Sambhota was sent by royal order [to India] in order to get the Indian doctrine and the model of the alphabet (yi ge'i dpe). . . ."

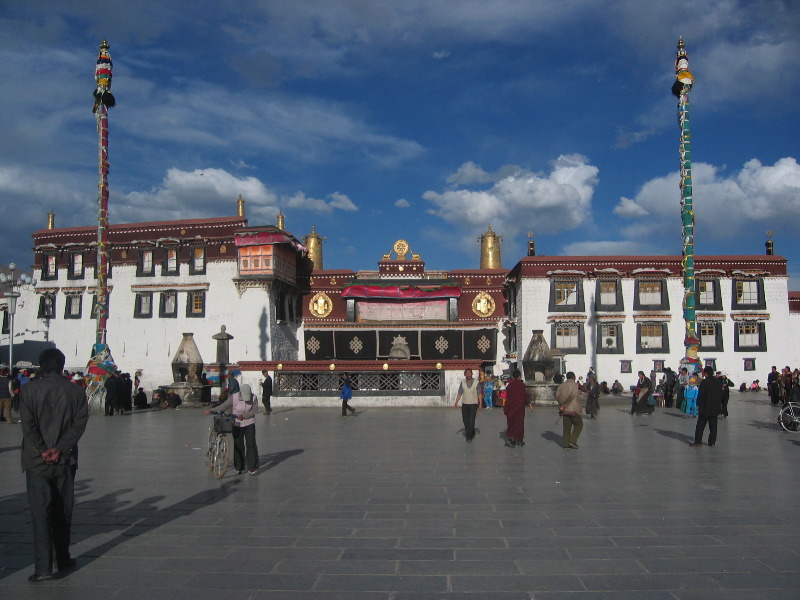
Bhrikuti's legacy—Jokhang Temple in Tibet—founded to house a statue of Buddha Akshobhya which she brought to Tibet

Bhrikuti was a devout Buddhist as was her father, and she brought many sacred buddhist images along with expert Newar craftsmen to Tibet as part of her dowry. Songtsen Gampo and Bhrikuti built the great temple, the Tsulag Khang (or 'House of Wisdom') to house the images, which is now known as the Jokhang Temple ('House of the Lord') in the heart of Lhasa, and is considered to be the most sacred temple in Tibet. Her statue of Jowo Mikyo Dorje was then housed in the Jokhang. They also built the red palace of dMar-po-ri which shifted the ancient seat of government in the Yarlung Valley at Yungbulakang to the site of modern Lhasa. The Red Palace, or Red Fort (Mar-po-ri Pho-drang) on Marpo Ri (Red Mountain) in Lhasa that was later rebuilt into the thirteen storey Potala by the Fifth Dalai Lama, was originally constructed by Nepali craftsmen. She also had constructed the Tub-wang and other statues in Samye and the famous Nepali artist Thro-wo carved the revered statue of Chenrezig, Thungji Chen-po rang-jung nga-ldan.

The famous statue Bhrikuti brought is called the Jowo Mikyo Dorje, which came originally from Bodhgaya and, according to the 8th Dalai Lama, the statue rested in Swayambhunath for seven months before being brought into Tibet. This statue is also called the Manuvajra, the Ramoche Jowo, or Jowo Chungpa. It is currently housed in the Ramoche Temple in Lhasa.

Through history, the Jokhang temple had been sacked at least two times – first during the Mongol invasions and later it was gutted in the 1960s during the Chinese invasion and Cultural Revolution. It is said that the lower half of the statue was found in a Lhasa rubbish dump and the upper part found in Beijing. The parts have since been joined and the statue is surrounded by the Eight Bodhisattvas and located at Ramoche.

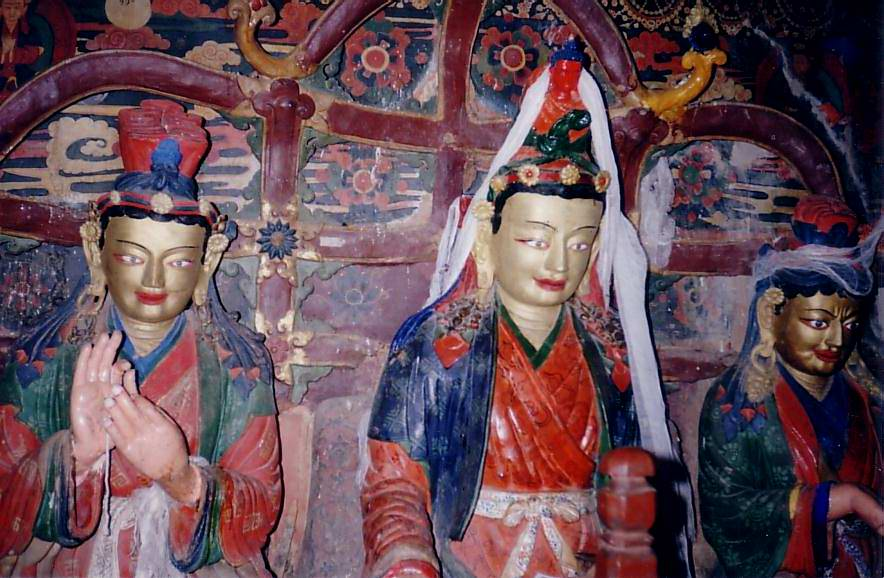
From right to left: Bhrikuti Devi, Songtsen Gampo and Wencheng, Gyantse

Bhrikuti is usually represented as Green Tara in Tibetan iconography. Songtsen Gampo also married the Chinese Princess Wencheng in 641, who is considered to be another incarnation of Tara, of White Tara. As queens, Bhrikuti and Wencheng are said to have worked together to establish temples and Buddhism in Tibet.

== See also ==
- Princess Wencheng
