= Zhanang County =

Zhanang County 扎囊县 • གྲ་ནང་རྫོང་། Dranang, Chanang
- County
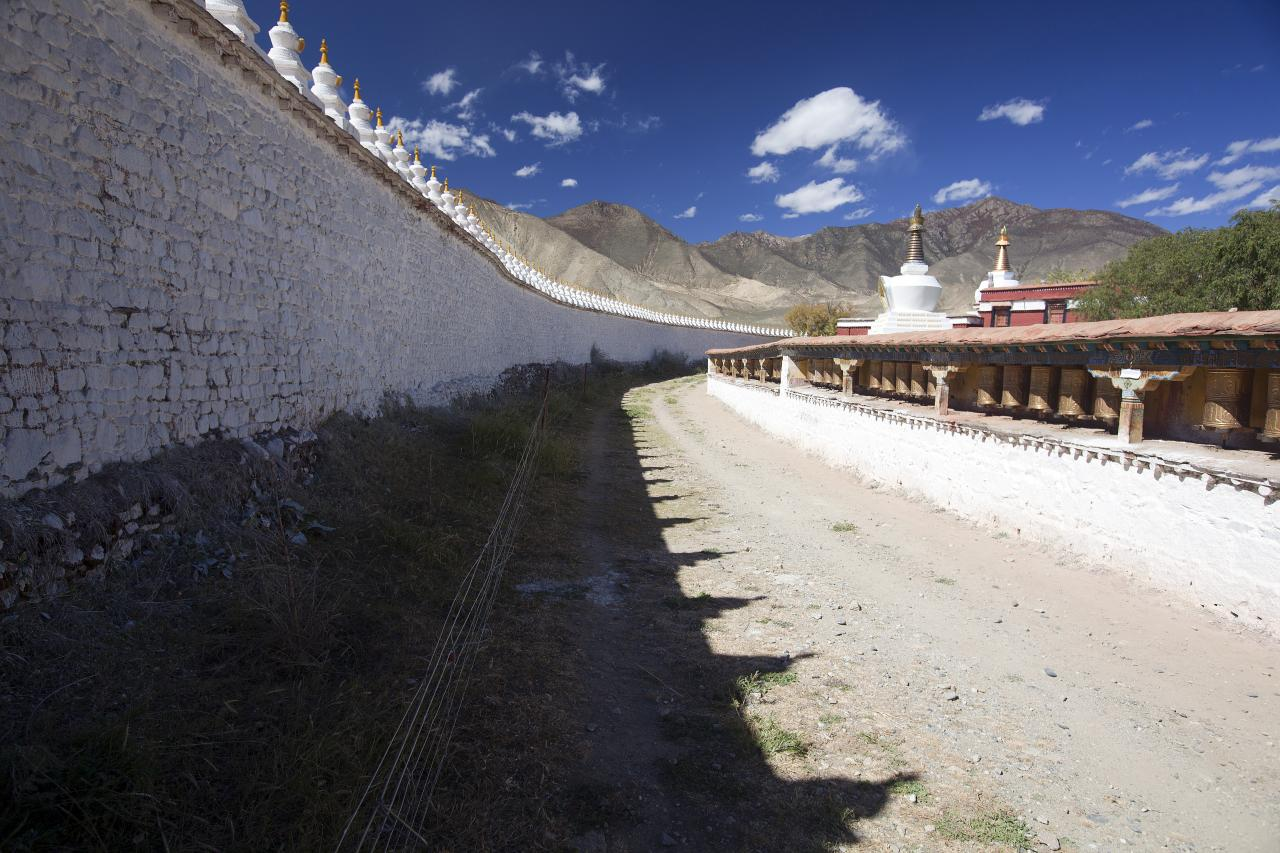
- Zhanang County

- Location in Tibet Zhanang County (China)
- Coordinates: 29°27′54″N 91°36′40″E
- Country: China
- Autonomous region: Tibet
- Prefecture-level city: Shannan (Lhokha)
- County seat: Dratang

Area
  - Total: 2,141.92 km^{2} (827.00 sq mi)

Population (2020)
  - Total: 36,656
  - Density: 17.114/km^{2} (44.324/sq mi)
- Time zone: UTC+8 (China Standard)
- Website: www.zhanang.gov.cn

Zhanang County

Chinese name
- Simplified Chinese: 扎囊县
- Traditional Chinese: 扎囊縣
Transcriptions
Standard Mandarin
- Hanyu Pinyin: Zhānáng Xiàn

Tibetan name
- Tibetan: གྲ་ནང་རྫོང་།
Transcriptions
- Wylie: gra nang rdzong
- Tibetan Pinyin: Chanang Zong

Zhanang County or Dranang (Tibetan: གྲ་ནང་རྫོང, Chinese: 扎囊县) is a county of Shannan (Lhokha) in the Tibet Autonomous Region, China. The capital town of county is Dratang town, with a monastery named Dratang.

== Geography ==
Dranang County is home to Samye Monastery, the first Buddhist monastery in Tibet, and many other monasteries, including Mindrolling Monastery.

Dranang County is separated into northern and southern parts by the Yarlung Tsangpo River. In 2015, a bridge near Dratang Town was finished, connecting the northern and southern parts of the county.

== History ==
Historically a strategic hub since the Tibetan Empire (7th–9th centuries CE), it served as a cultural and administrative center under the patronage of the Nyingma school of Tibetan Buddhism. The county's name, Dranang, meaning "thorn grove" in Tibetan, reflects its early settlement patterns in the arid valleys.

Zhanang was established as a county in April 1960 following Tibet's democratic reforms, initially under the Lhoka Special Administrative Region. Its boundaries were formalized in 1987, encompassing 5 townships and 3 towns by 2015. A major restructuring in 2021 merged rural townships into urban units, reducing divisions to 3 towns and 2 townships. The county's 2,173 km² area blends agricultural plains with rugged mountains, sustaining barley farming and traditional crafts like Tibetan incense production.

== Administrative divisions ==
Dranang County contains 2 towns and 3 townships.

Name	Chinese	Hanyu Pinyin	Tibetan	Wylie
Towns
Dratang Town	扎塘镇	Zhātáng zhèn	གྲ་ཐང་གྲོང་རྡལ།	grang thang grong rdal
Samye Town	桑耶镇	Sāngyē zhèn	བསམ་ཡས་གྲོང་རྡལ།	bsam yas grong rdal
Townships
Drachi Township	扎其乡	Zhāqí xiāng	གྲ་ཕྱི་ཤང་།	gra phyi shang
Ngadra Township	阿扎乡	Āzhā xiāng	ལྔ་གྲ་ཤང་།	lnga gra shang
Gyiru Township	吉汝乡	Jírǔ xiāng	དཀྱིལ་རུ་ཤང་།	dkyil ru shang

== Climate ==
Climate data for Dranang (1981−2010)
Month	Jan	Feb	Mar	Apr	May	Jun	Jul	Aug	Sep	Oct	Nov	Dec	Year
Mean daily maximum °C (°F)	8.7 (47.7)	10.7 (51.3)	14.2 (57.6)	17.3 (63.1)	20.9 (69.6)	24.1 (75.4)	23.2 (73.8)	22.0 (71.6)	20.6 (69.1)	17.9 (64.2)	13.1 (55.6)	9.2 (48.6)	16.8 (62.3)
Daily mean °C (°F)	−0.6 (30.9)	2.4 (36.3)	6.4 (43.5)	9.5 (49.1)	13.3 (55.9)	16.7 (62.1)	16.4 (61.5)	15.7 (60.3)	13.9 (57.0)	9.6 (49.3)	3.2 (37.8)	−0.7 (30.7)	8.8 (47.9)
Mean daily minimum °C (°F)	−8.2 (17.2)	−5.4 (22.3)	−1.4 (29.5)	2.3 (36.1)	6.3 (43.3)	10.4 (50.7)	11.3 (52.3)	11.0 (51.8)	9.0 (48.2)	3.4 (38.1)	−4.2 (24.4)	−7.9 (17.8)	2.2 (36.0)
Average precipitation mm (inches)	0.4 (0.02)	0.3 (0.01)	1.6 (0.06)	6.9 (0.27)	20.3 (0.80)	49.6 (1.95)	119.4 (4.70)	122.5 (4.82)	66.4 (2.61)	8.8 (0.35)	0.4 (0.02)	0.5 (0.02)	397.1 (15.63)
Average relative humidity (%)	35	29	30	38	44	51	63	67	64	51	43	43	47
Source: Weather China

== Gallery ==
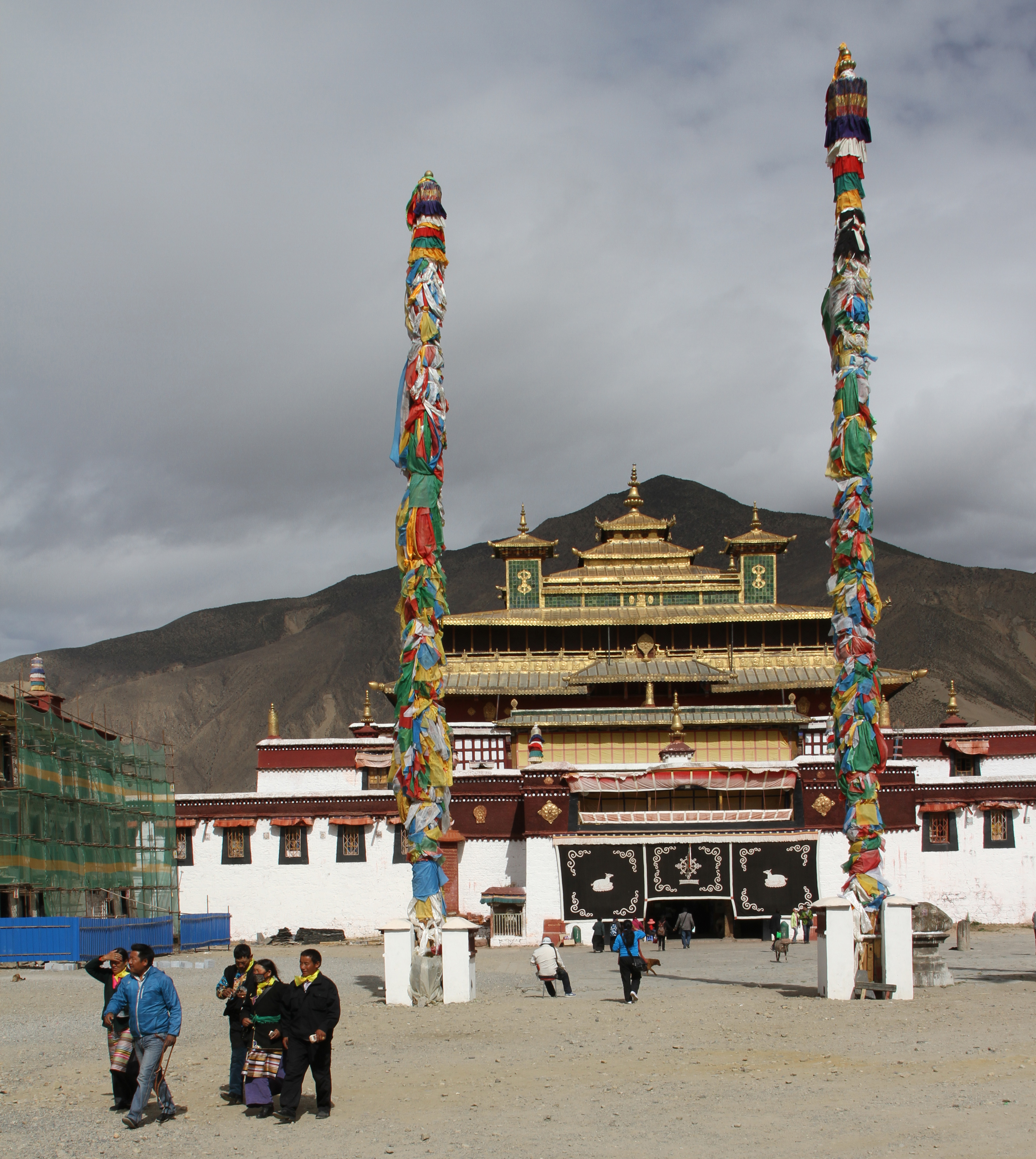
Samye monastery

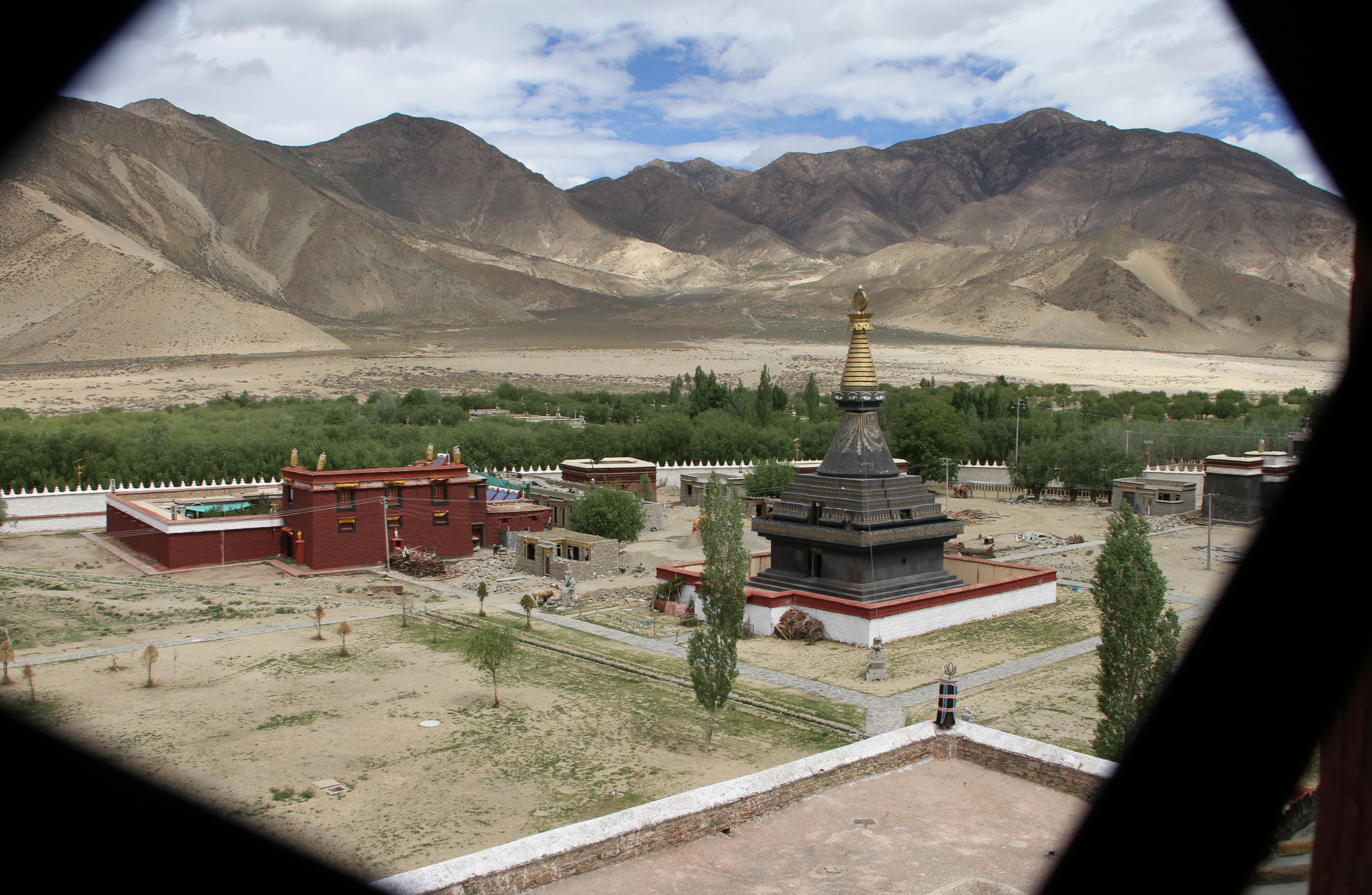
Black stupa of Samye

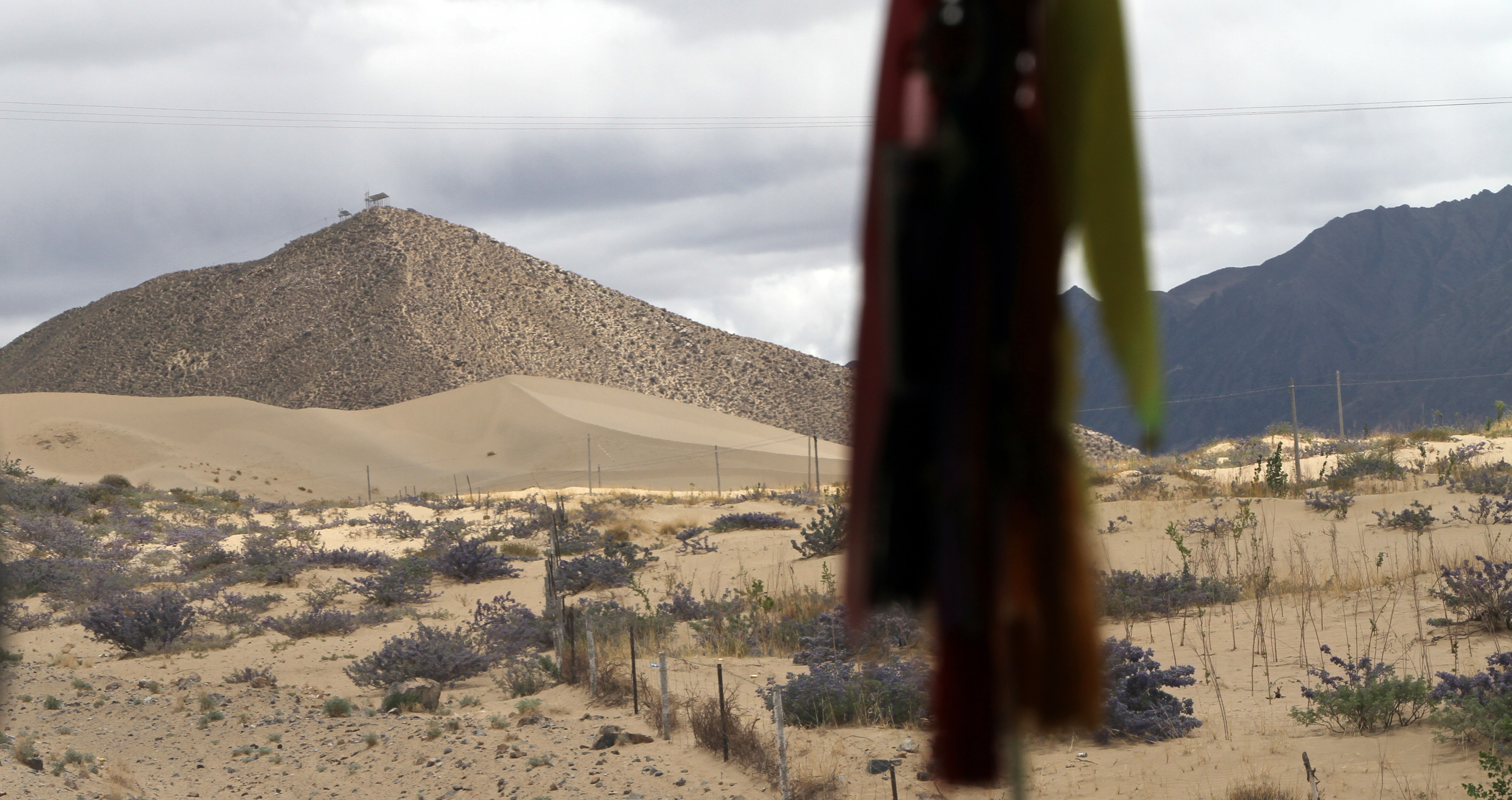
Near Samye monastery

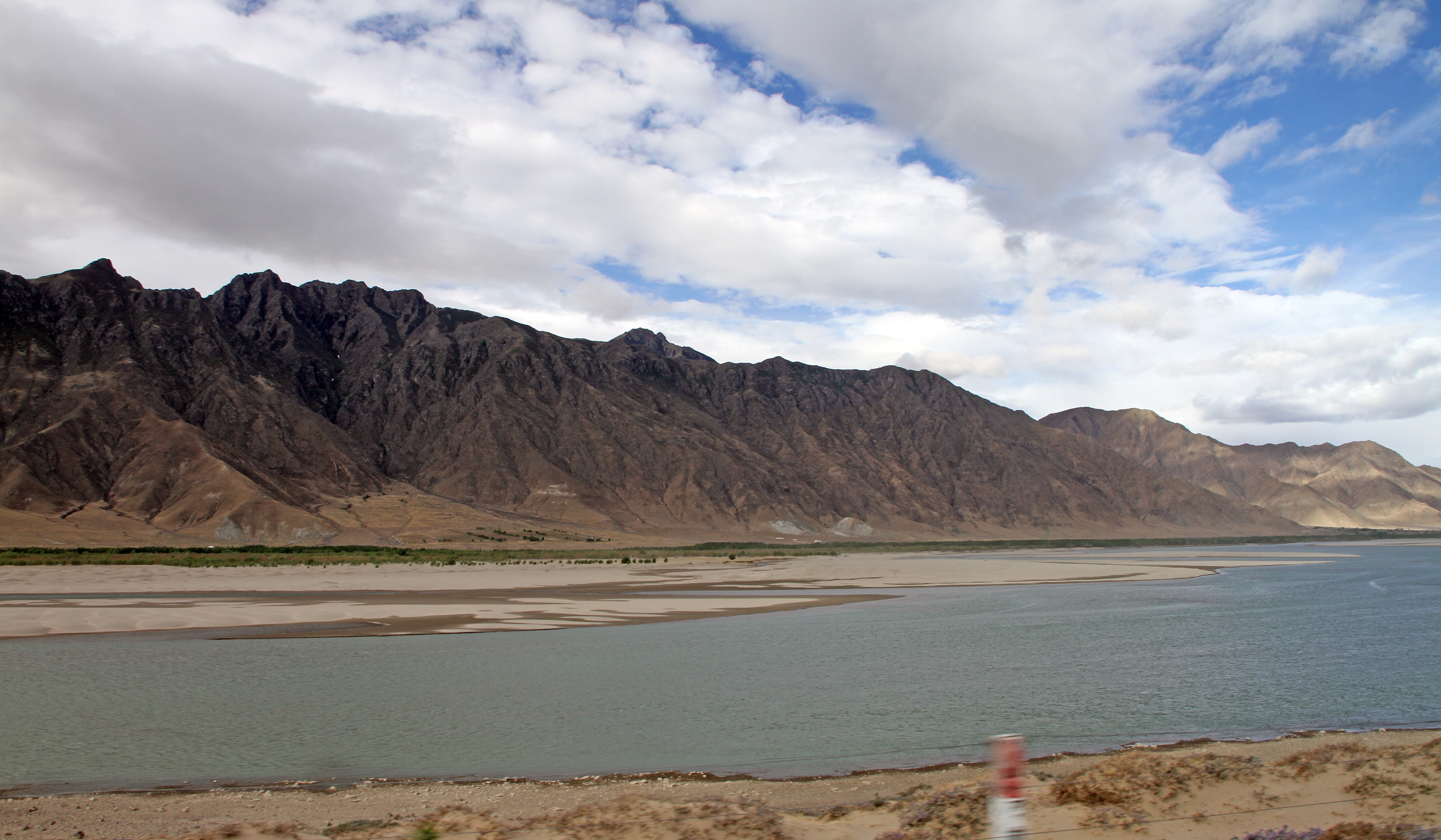
Yarlung Tsangpo

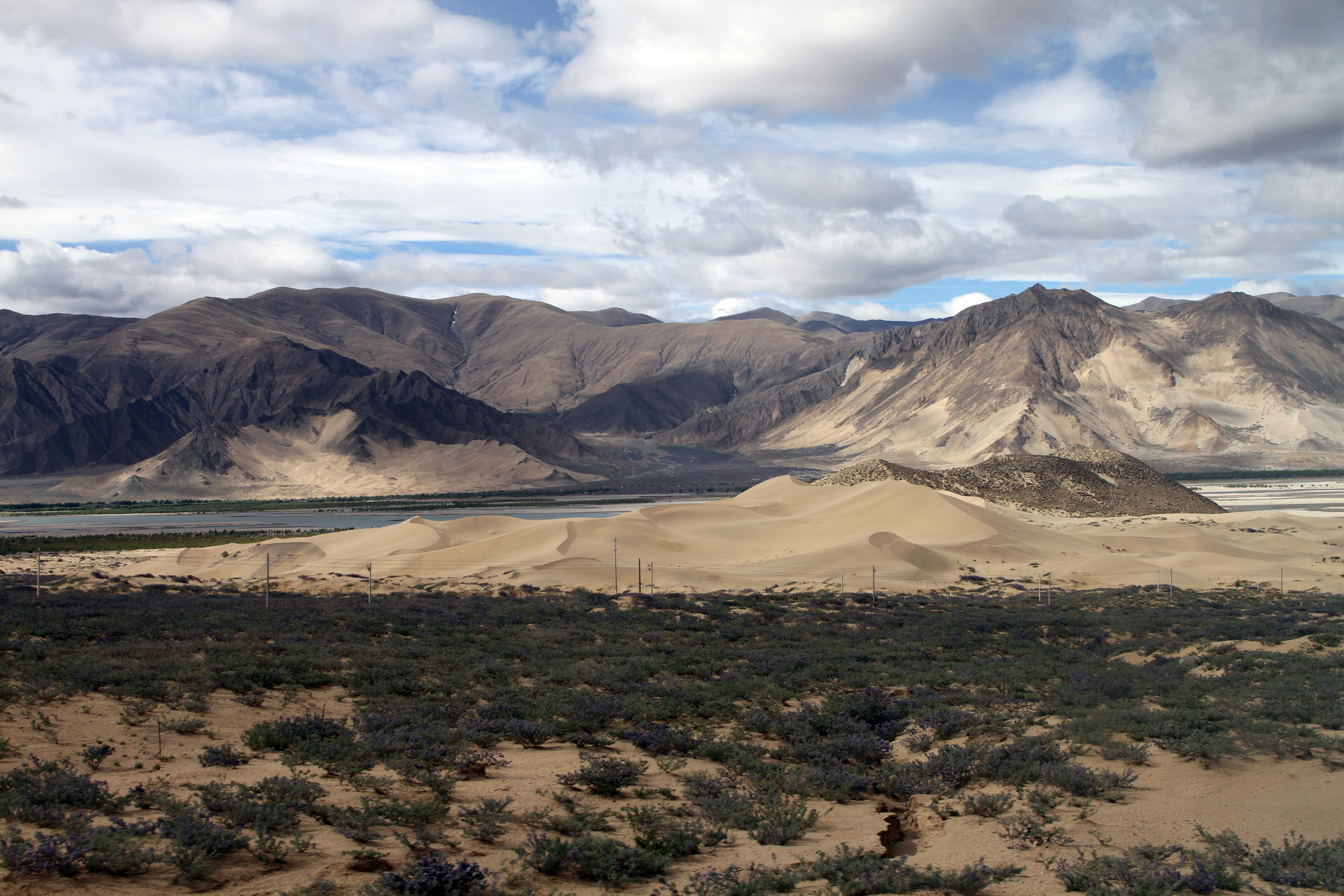
Yarlung Tsangpo

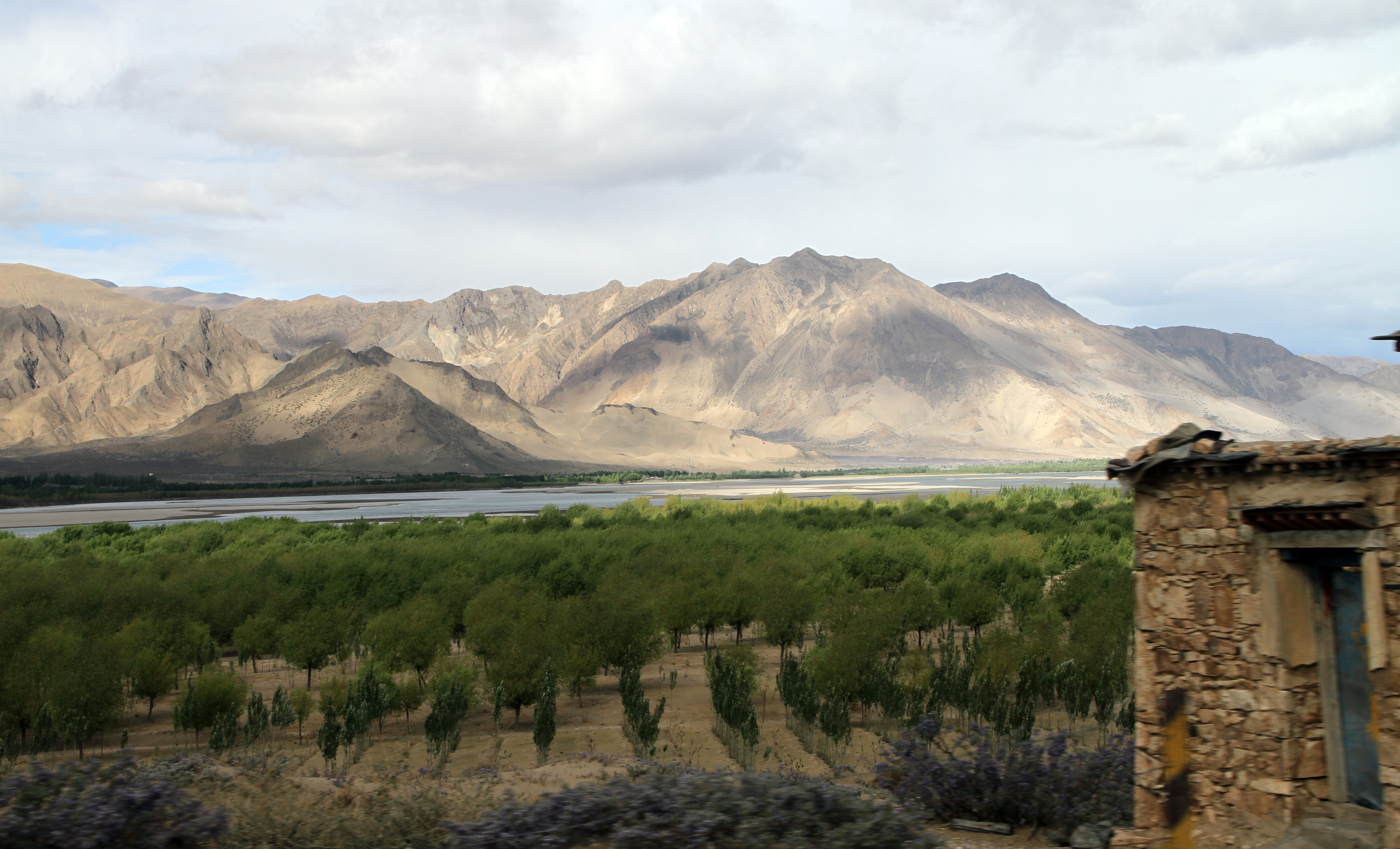
Yarlung Tsangpo
