= Budhi =

Budhi बुढी
- Village development committee
- Location in Nepal
- Coordinates: 27.65°N 83.01°E
- Country: Nepal
- Zone: Lumbini Zone
- District: Kapilvastu District

Population (1991)
  - Total: 5,871
- Time zone: UTC+5:45 (Nepal Time)

Budhi is a village development committee in Kapilvastu District in the Lumbini Zone of southern Nepal. At the time of the 1991 Nepal census it had a population of 5871 people living in 956 individual households.
