= Ramoche Temple =

Tibetan Buddhist monastery in Lhasa, Tibet, China

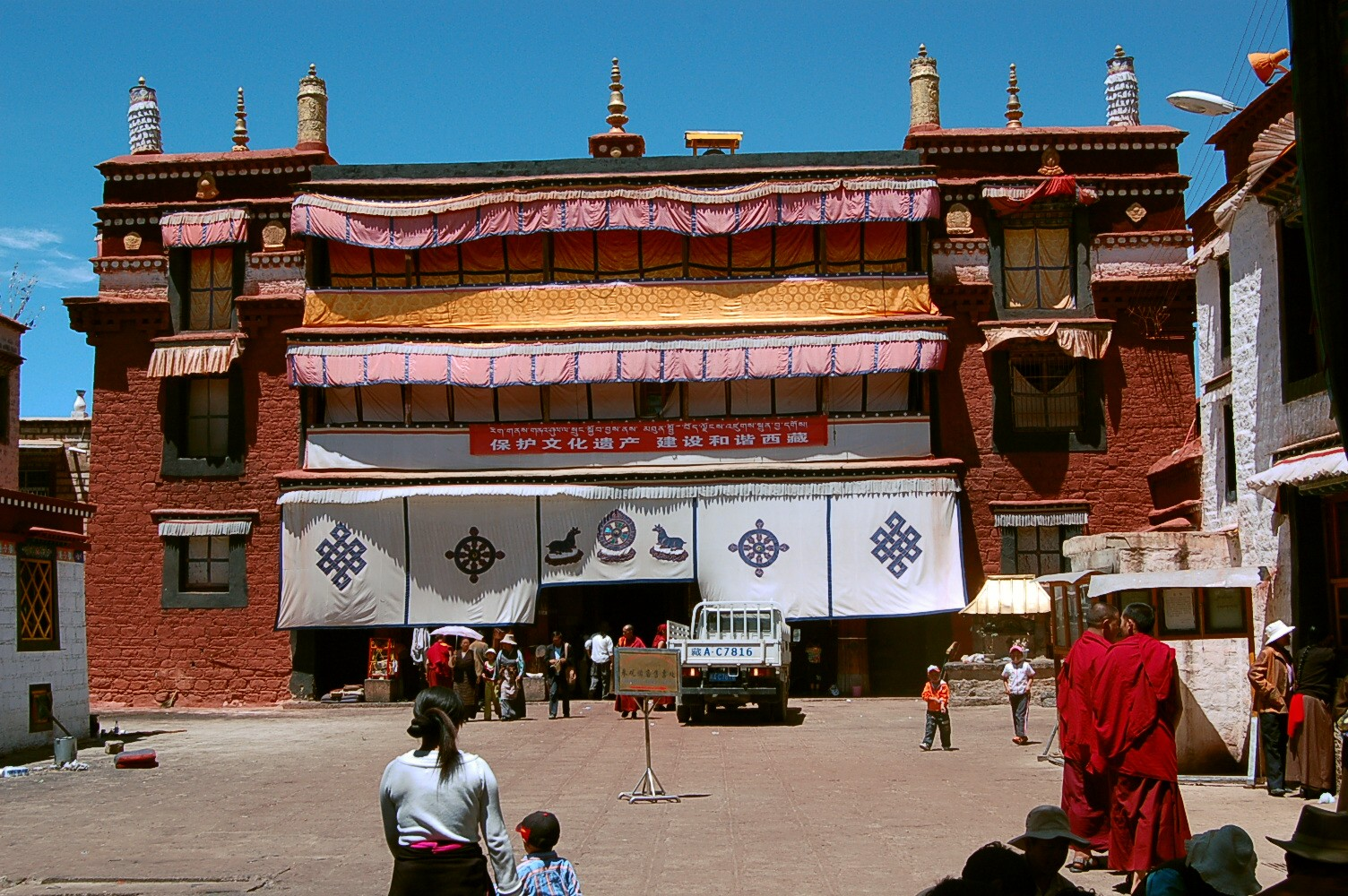
- RamocheTemple

- Location within Tibet Autonomous Region

Religion
- Affiliation: Tibetan Buddhism
- Sect: Gelug

Location
- Location: Lhasa, Tibet Autonomous Region, China
- Interactive map of Ramoche Temple
- Coordinates: 29°39′31″N 91°7′49″E

Architecture
- Style: Han and Tibetan

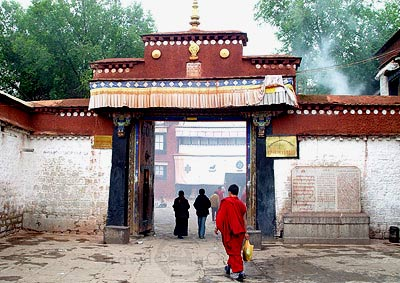
Gate of the Ramoche Temple

Ramoche Temple (Tibetan: ར་མོ་ཆེ་དགོན་པ་, Wylie: Ra-mo-che Dgon-pa, Chinese: 小昭寺; pinyin: Xiǎozhāo Sì) is a Buddhist monastery in Lhasa, Tibet Autonomous Region. It dates back to the seventh century and is considered to be the most important temple in the city after the Jokhang Temple. It is in the northwestern part of Lhasa, east of the Potala and north of the Jokhang. The site occupies an area of 4,000 square meters (almost one acre).

== History ==
A small bronze statue of the Buddha brought to Lhasa by the Nepalese queen, Bhrikuti, was badly damaged by the Red Guards during China's Cultural Revolution.

The original temple was destroyed by fire, and a three-storied building was constructed in 1474. Soon after it became the Assembly Hall of the Gyuto Order, or Upper Tantric College of Lhasa and was home to 500 monks.

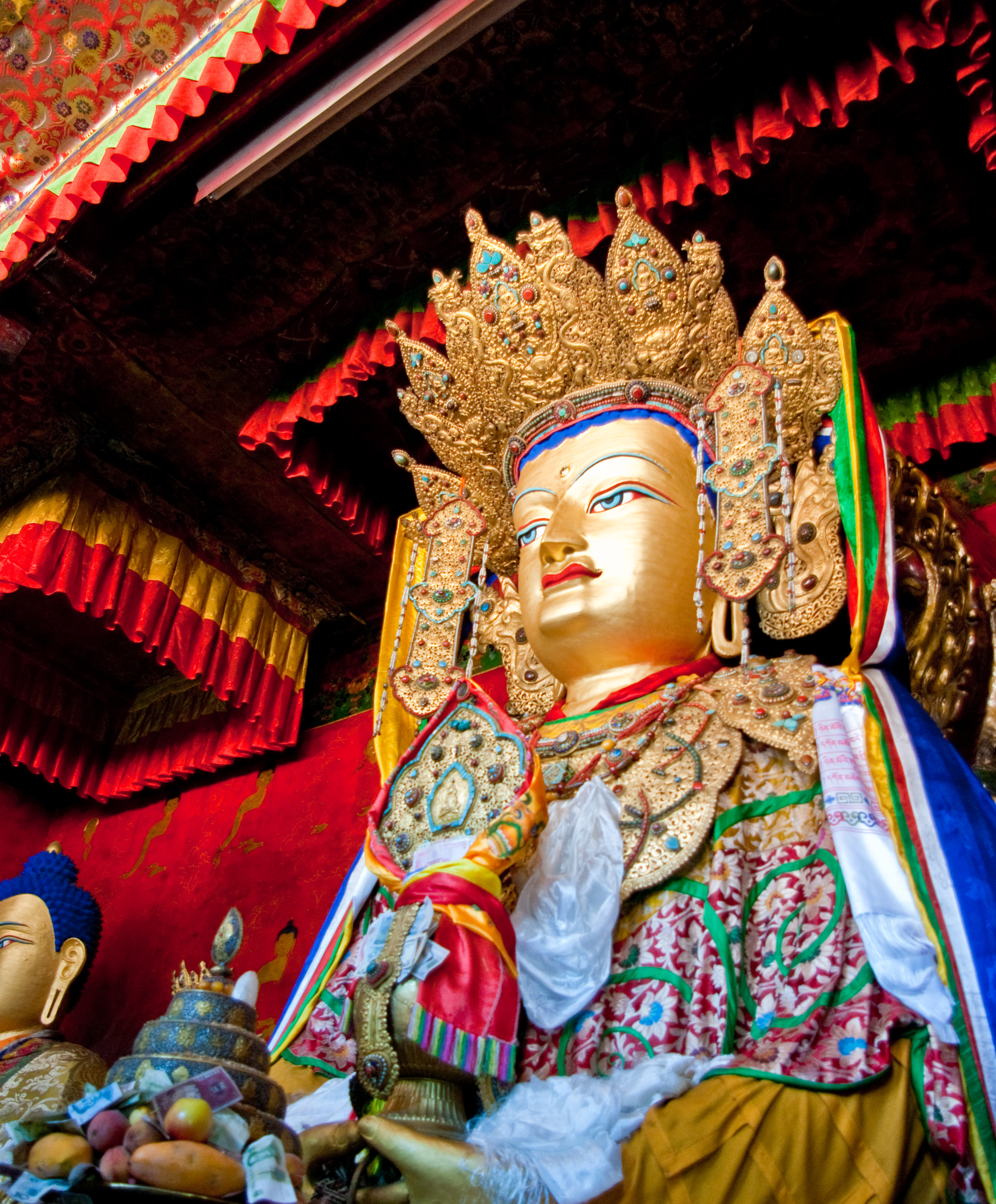
Jowo Mikyoe Dorje of the Ramoche Temple

== Destruction and restoration ==
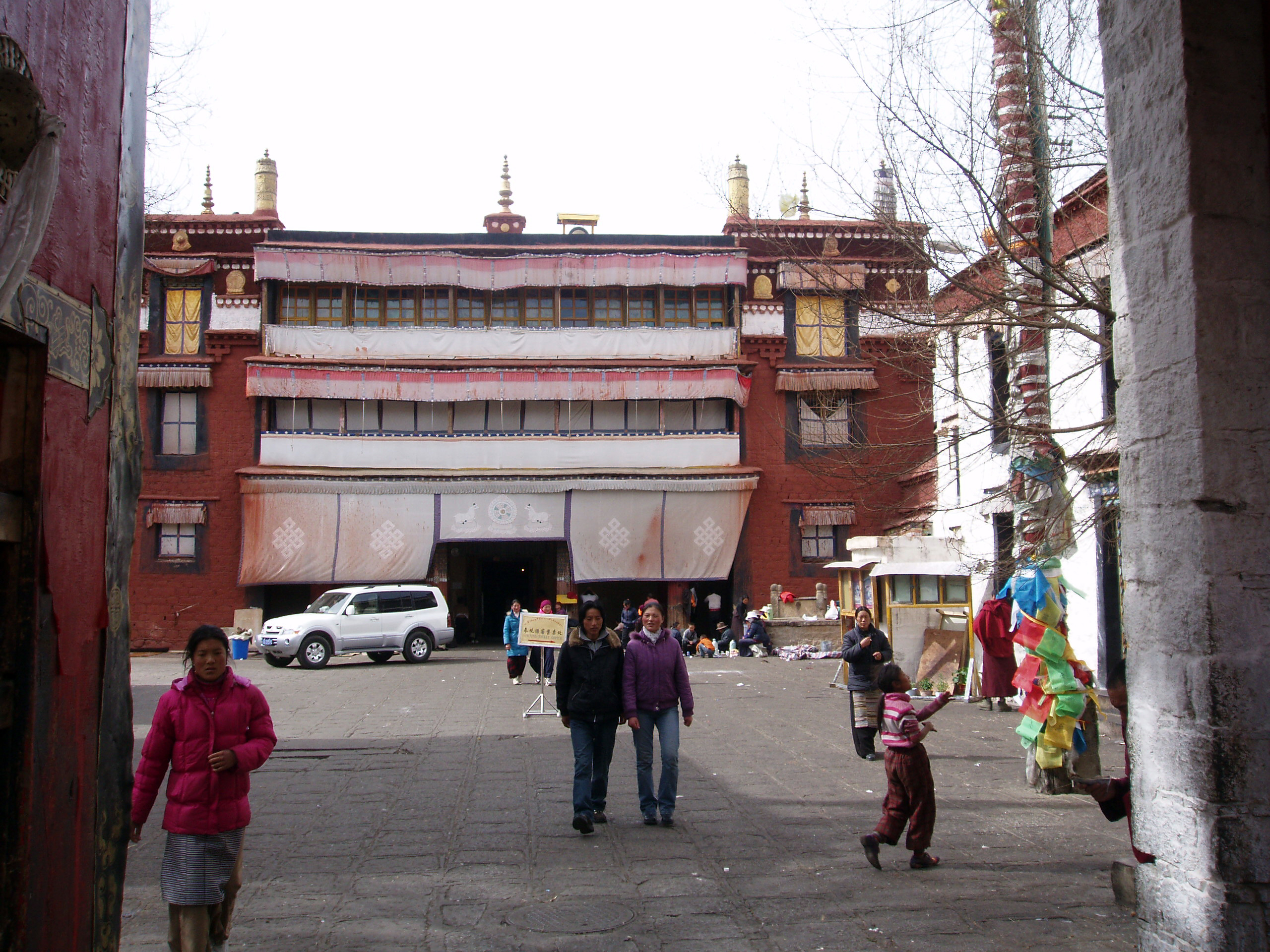
Entrance to Ramoche Temple

The temple was gutted by fire and destroyed in 1959. Lhasa uprising against Chinese occupation and the bronze statue disappeared. In 1983 the lower part of it was said to have been found in a Lhasa rubbish tip, and the upper half in Beijing. Thanks to the efforts of Ri 'bur sprul sku, the parts were joined in the Ramoche Temple, which was partially restored in 1986.

A major restoration was undertaken in 1986 and the temple now has three stories. Near the main entrance to the building are ten pillars displaying local relics and symbols such as lotus flowers, jewellery, coiling clouds and Tibetan characters. The first floor has an atrium off which opens a scripture hall and the winding corridors of a Buddha palace. The second floor is mainly residential but has a chapel with an image of Buddha as King of the Nagas, and the third floor provides sleeping quarters reserved for the use of the Dalai Lama.
