= Tromzikhang =

Historic building in Lhasa, Tibet

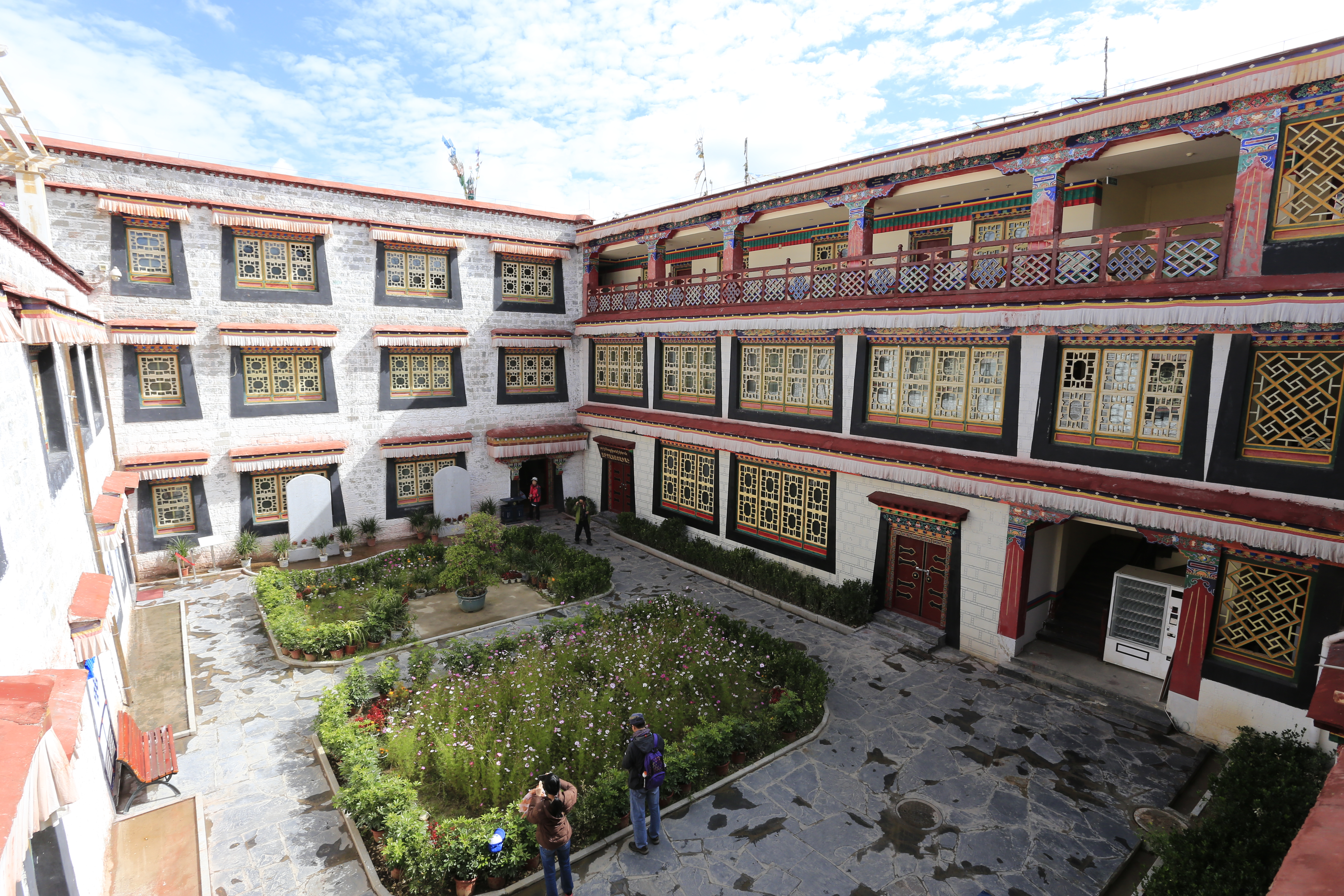
- View of Tromzikhang

Religion
- Affiliation: Tibetan Buddhism

Location
- Country: China
- Interactive map of Tromzikhang
- Coordinates: 29°39′13.26″N 91°07′58.6″E

Architecture
- Style: Dzong
- Established: 1700; 326 years ago

Tromzikhang (Tibetan: ཁྲོམ་གཟིགས་ཁང་།; Wylie: khrom gzigs khang) is a historic building in Barkhor, Lhasa in Tibet, China. It is located northwest of Jokhang temple at the corner of the left side of Barkhor Tromshung Jang (street). It was demolished in the 1990s except for the magnificent facade. Today Tromzikhang is a notable market in Lhasa and a housing complex.

== History ==
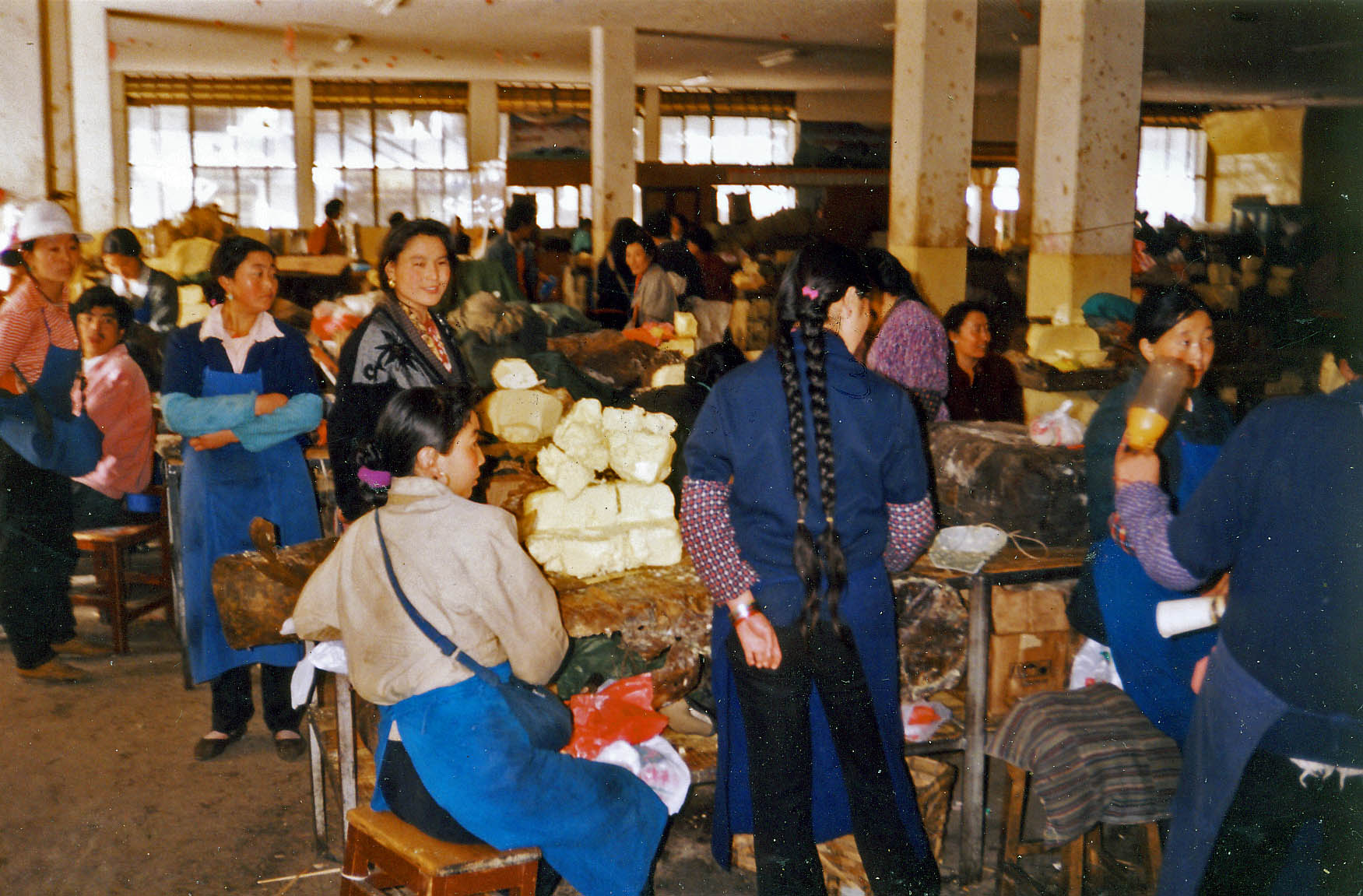
Yak butter market in the Tromzikhang, 1993

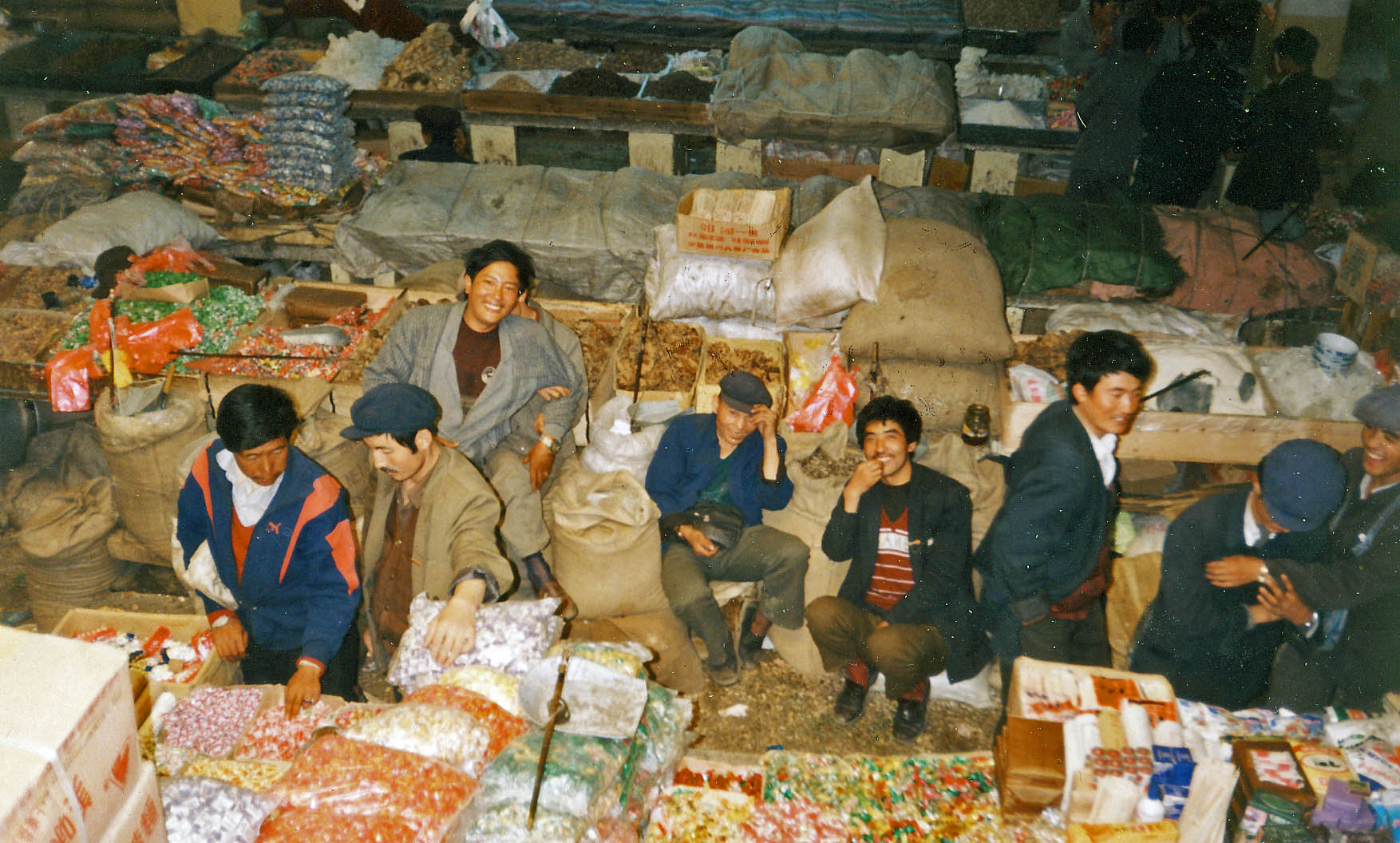
Candy market in the Tromzikhang, 1993

It was built in around 1700 on Barkhor Tromshung Jang and was once a government building for officials such as the Ambans, representatives of the Qing emperor. It was built under the command of the 6th Dalai Lama (1683–1706) and is sometimes referred to as the 6th Dalai Lama's Palace.

A widening of the Barkhor over a length of some 80 metres forms the space of the Barkor Tromshung Jang. The Tromzikhang was built on the sunny northern side of the Barkor Tromshung Jang (North Barkhor Square). The surviving, but still splendid, symmetrical, three-storied façade runs the whole length of this side of the square. Where Ramoche Lam (Barkhor Changtrom Sanlan) enters the Barkhor from the north there used to be a large stupa and mani wall, now both completely demolished. It was 40 metres at its widest and 20 metres at its narrowest.

Between 1938 and 1949, Tromzikhang was used as a Republican School, with a staff of Chinese, Hui and Tibetan teachers. It was built primarily for the local Chinese population of merchants with a number of staff from the Chinese Mission. Phuntsok Wangyal, a progressive pro-Communist Tibetan from Batang who founded the Tibetan Communist Party, also taught there for some time. The school taught pupils such as Gyalo Dondrup, the eldest brother of the 14th Dalai Lama as well as Nepalese and Muslim minorities living in Lhasa. The school was closed down in 1949 when the Chinese Mission was expelled from Tibet.

== Architecture ==
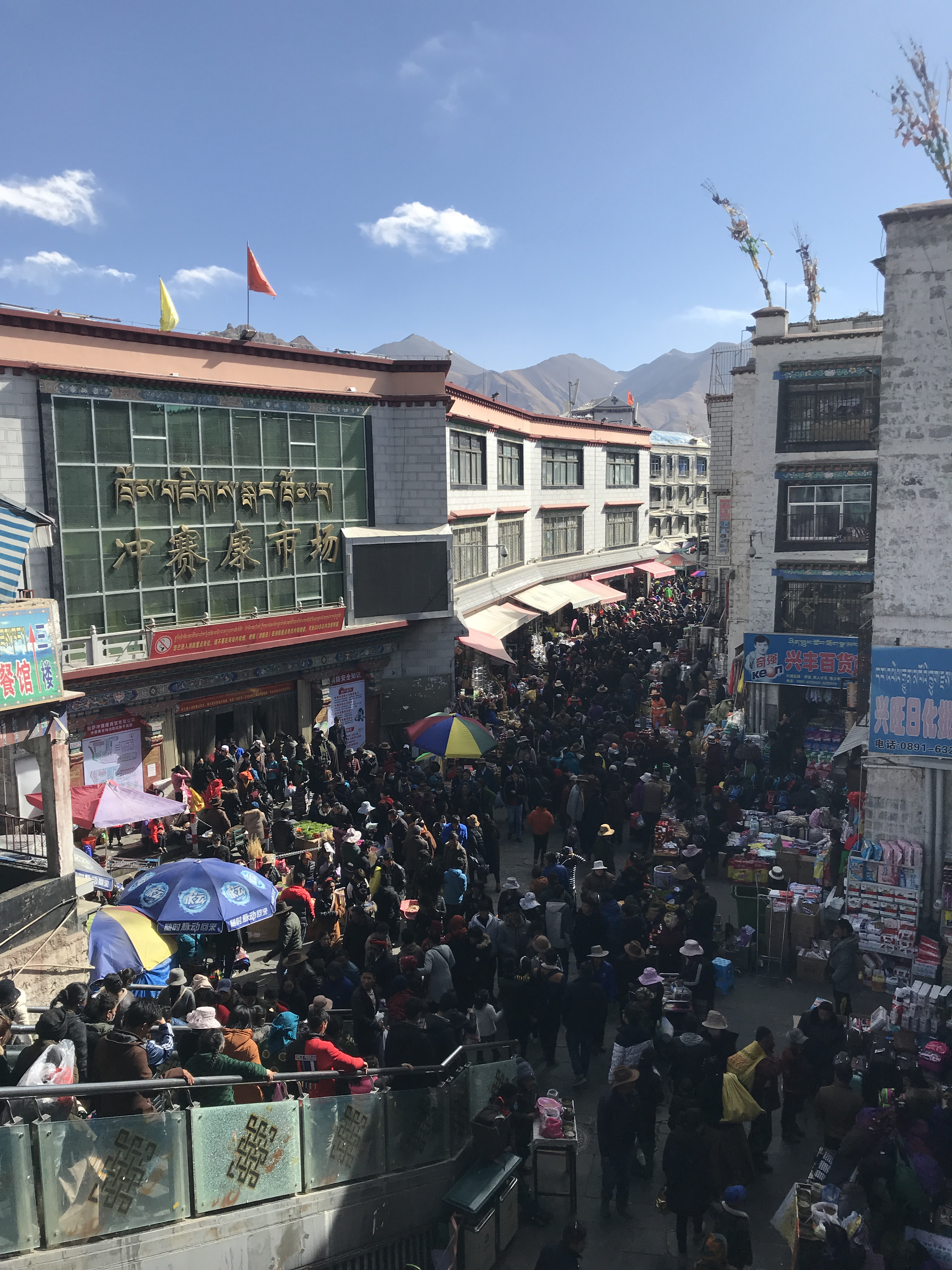
Tromzikhang Market, Lhasa.

The building is characterized by its length; it has a 63-metre (207 ft) facade.

The red "Pembe" stripe, located at the roof level, is used to signify that the residence was intended to be used by an incarnated lama. The interior of the complex was demolished in 1997–1998 by the Chinese government. Nevertheless, the Barkor Street facade was retained during the redevelopments, and the area is now a housing complex and notable market.

== Market ==
Today Tromzikhang market sells items such as yak butter, cheese, tea, noodles, vegetables and candy. A July 1994 study revealed that some 70% of traders at the market are Chinese. Nearby is Tromzikhang Bus Station and a mosque and a small 15th century building housing a two-story image of the Maitreya, named the Jamkhang. Tromzikhang and the mosque were badly affected by the anti-government protests in 2008.
