= Tibetan Communist Party =

Political party in Tibet that existed from 1943 to 1949

- Leader: Phuntsok Wangyal
- Founders: Phuntsok Wangyal; Ngawang Kesang
- Founded: 1943
- Dissolved: 1949
- Merged into: Chinese Communist Party
- Ideology: Communism; Marxism–Leninism; Tibetan nationalism
- Political position: Far-left

Tibetan Communist Party

Tibetan name
- Tibetan: བོད་གུང་ཁྲན་ཏང
Transcriptions
- Wylie: bod gung khran tang
- THL: bö gung tren tang

Chinese name
- Traditional Chinese: 西藏共產黨
- Simplified Chinese: 西藏共产党
Transcriptions
Standard Mandarin
- Hanyu Pinyin: Xīzàng Gòngchǎndǎng

The Tibetan Communist Party (Note: Tibetan: བོད་གུང་ཁྲན་ཏང, Wylie: bod gung khran tang, THL: bö gung tren tang; Chinese: 西藏共產黨; pinyin: Xīzàng Gòngchǎndǎng) was a small communist party in Tibet which functioned in secrecy under various names. The group was founded by Phuntsok Wangyal and Ngawang Kesang in 1943. It emerged from a group called the Tibetan Democratic Youth League, formed by Wangyal and other Tibetan students in Lhasa in 1939.

The party sought to establish an independent and socialist Tibet encompassing the three traditional regions of Tibet: Ü-Tsang, Kham, and Amdo. The party contacted the Soviet embassy in Beijing and asked for the Soviets' assistance as it began planning a socialist uprising in Tibet. Wangyal later contacted the Chinese Communist Party and the Communist Party of India.

The Tibetan communists prepared guerrilla struggles against the ruling Kuomintang while promoting democratic reforms inside Tibet.

In 1949, the party merged into the Chinese Communist Party.
